Midwood Books was an American publishing house active from 1957 to 1968. Its strategy focused on the male readers' market, competing with other publishers such as Beacon Books. The covers of many Midwood Books featured works by prolific illustrators of the era, including Paul Rader.

Novels from Midwood Books were written by many well-known authors, most writing under pseudonyms. Among these were Lawrence Block, Donald E. Westlake, Robert Silverberg, and Richard E. Geis.

History 
Harry Shorten was a writer and editor who had worked for MLJ Comics, publisher of Archie, for most of the 1940s and 1950s. He had made his fortune by creating, with comics artist Al Fagaly, a syndicated gag cartoon called There Oughta Be a Law!.

Looking for an investment in the financial results of his comics, Shorten decided to become an editor of paperbacks. He wanted to follow the example of publishers Beacon Books and Universal Distributing, which specialized in publishing cheap, lightweight books telling dramatic or erotic romances, with suggestive covers, for a male audience. Thus he created in 1957 the publishing house Midwood Books, named after his neighborhood in Brooklyn. At the time, the publishing house address was 505 Eighth Avenue in Manhattan.

Unlike other New York publishers such as Bennett Cerf at Random House, Shorten did not have extensive knowledge of quality literature. But he knew what would entice the average American reader. His books were bright, colorful, and eye-catching. Midwood's first publications were paperback collections of the There Oughta Be a Law! strips and an unnumbered book series in the same style as Beacon Books. With the 1958 release of Midwood 007 —  Love Nest, by Robert Silverberg, writing as "Loren Beauchamp" — began the emergence of authors and artists recognized later as appurtenant to Midwood. Shorten quickly began soliciting manuscripts from the Scott Meredith Literary Agency (which also provided manuscripts for fellow pulp publisher Nightstand Books).

Only five people wrote most of the first 40 issues of the Midwood numbered series:  Lawrence Block ("Sheldon Lord"), Robert Silverberg ("Loren Beauchamp"), Donald E. Westlake ("Alan Marshall""), Orrie Hitt, and Hal Dresner ("Don Holliday"). This group stabilized Midwood until Shorten was able to put together a stable of recurring writers, such as Sally Singer, Gilbert Fox, Julie Ellis, John Plunkett, and Elaine Williams. Although nobody at Midwood knew it at the time, several writers were providing books for both Midwood and Nightstand, but under different pen names. For example, "Loren Beauchamp" (Robert Silverberg) become "Don Elliott" a year later at Nightstand, "Sheldon Lord" (Lawrence Block) became "Andrew Shaw." Some writers wrote under the same name for both publishers.

Shorten obtained his cover illustrations from the Art Balcourt Service, the same agency that provided covers for Beacon. Artists such as Nappi, Rader, and Robert Maguire were significant to the company's success. The covers sold the books: Midwood's novels were not great literature, but were generally very entertaining. Many pages contained sex scenes, described as pornographic, full of insinuations and veiled references. Although romances and melodramas were of more interest to women, the target audience of companies like Midwood and Beacon was men. This was apparent from their covers.

In 1964, Midwood merged with Tower Publications to form two subsidiaries: Midwood-Tower and Tower Comics. Shorten went on to be editor-in-chief of Tower Comics. By 1965, Midwood's headquarters were at 185 Madison Avenue (alongside fellow pulp publisher Lancer Books).

Popularity among lesbians 
Pulp titles with strong connotations of lesbians were very popular; the authors were frequently men using female pen names, such as "Barbara Brooks," "Jill Emerson," and "Kimberly Kemp;" while the target audience was male readers, an unexpected second small audience base was lesbians themselves, with these books often reviewed in early lesbian and gay publications such as One Magazine and The Ladder by Barbara Grier, under her pseudonym "Gene Damon." Julie Ellis, though not lesbian herself (unlike Singer and Williams), bucked her bosses by insisting on putting happy endings for the lesbian lovers in her lesbian pulp fiction, a brave act for which she received much appreciative fan mail from emerging lesbian social and activist groups during Ellis's Midwood-Tower authorship period (1962-1968).

Authors 
 Lawrence Block, writing as "Sheldon Lord"
  Hal Dresner, writing as "Don Holliday"
 Julie Ellis, writing as "Joan Ellis," "Susan Richards," and similar pseudonyms
 Gilbert Fox, writing as "Dallas Mayo" and "Kimberly Kemp"
 Richard E. Geis, writing as "Peggy Swenson"
 Jay Greene
 Orrie Hitt
 Al James
 Stuart James
 William Johnston
 William Knoles, writing as "Clyde Allison"
 Barry N. Malzberg, writing as "Mel Johnson".
 Pat Perdue, writing as "Randy Salem"
 John Plunkett, writing as "Jason Sloane Hytes"
 Robert Silverberg, writing as "Loren Beauchamp"
 Sally Singer, writing as "March Hastings"
 Donald E. Westlake, writing as "Alan Marshall"
 Elaine Williams, writing as "Sloane Britain" and similar pseudonyms. Some have stated she committed suicide in 1963 as a result of the social stigma she suffered as a lesbian. Other sources indicate that the car she was in skidded on snow and hit a tree head-on, killing Williams and gravely injuring her husband at the time.

Selected titles 
source:

Midwood series 1-394 
 Midwood 1:  There Oughta Be A Law! by Harry Shorten & Al Fagaly
 Midwood 2:  
 Midwood 3:  
 Midwood 4:  There Oughta Be A Law! by Harry Shorten & Al Fagaly
 Midwood 5:  I Take What I Want by Hal Ellson
 Midwood 6:  Call Me Mistress by Tomlin Rede
 1958 Midwood 7: Love Nest, by Loren Beauchamp — the first numbered titled in the Midwood series
 1958 Midwood 8: Carla, by Sheldon Lord
 1959 Midwood 9: A Strange Kind of Love, by Sheldon Lord
 Midwood 10:  Affair With Lucy by Orrie Hitt
 Midwood 11:  Immoral Wife by Gordon Mitchell
 Midwood 12:  Girl Of The Streets by Orrie Hitt
 Midwood 13:  Hired Lover by Fred Martin
 1959 Midwood 14: Born to Be Bad, by Sheldon Lord
 1959 Midwood 15: All My Lovers, by Alan Marshall — later reprinted as Midwood 129 (1960)
 Midwood 16:  Summer Romance by Orrie Hitt
 1959 Midwood 17: Backstage Love (Vol. I of the Phil Crawford trilogy), by Alan Marshall — later reprinted as Midwood 149: Apprentice Virgin (1962)
 Midwood 18:  Connie by Loren Beauchamp
 Midwood 19:  Only The Bed by Don Holiday
 1959 Midwood 20: Man Hungry, by Alan Marshall — later reprinted as Midwood 147 (1961)
 Midwood 21:  Unwilling Sinner by Loren Beauchamp
 1959 Midwood 22: Sally, by Alan Marshall — later reprinted as Midwood 062 (1960)
 Midwood 23:  As Bad As They Come by Orrie Hitt
 1959 Midwood 24: 69 Barrow Street, by Sheldon Lord
 Midwood 25:  Sin School by Don Holliday
 Midwood 26:  Just Ask For Margaret by W.B. Tasker
 1960 Midwood 27:  Another Night, Another Love by Loren Beauchamp by although numbered as 29 is assumed to be 27
 1960 Midwood 28: All the Girls Were Willing (Vol. II of the Phil Crawford trilogy), by Alan Marshall — later reprinted as Midwood 166: What Girls Will Do (1962)
 1960 Midwood 29: Another Night, Another Love: An Original Novel, by Loren Beauchamp
 Midwood 29:  Of Shame And Joy by Sheldon Lord
 1960 Midwood 30: Meg, by Loren Beauchamp
 1960 Midwood 31: The Wife Next Door, by Alan Marshall
 1960 Midwood 33: A Woman Must Love, by Sheldon Lord
 Midwood 34:  The Cheaters by Orrie Hitt
 1960 Midwood 35: Kept, by Sheldon Lord
 1960 Midwood 36: Virgin's Summer, by Alan Marshall
 Midwood 37:  Anybody's Girl by March Hastings
 Midwood 38:  A Doctor And His Mistress by Orrie Hitt
 Midwood 39:  The Sins Of Martha Leslie by Don Holliday
 1960 Midwood 40: Candy, by Sheldon Lord
 1960 Midwood 41: A Girl Called Honey, by Sheldon Lord & Alan Marshall — dedication: "This is for Don Westlake and Larry Block, who introduced us"
 Midwood 42:  Stag Model by James Harvey
 Midwood 43:  Chita by Max Gareth
 Midwood 44:  Strange Breed by Aldo Lucchesi
 Midwood 45:  Two Of A Kind by Orrie Hitt
 Midwood 46:  Glad To Be Bad by Adam Roberts
 Midwood 47:  Unnatural by Sloan Britton
 1960 Midwood 48: So Willing,  by Sheldon Lord & Alan Marshall — dedication: "to Nedra & Loretta" [Nedra Westlake and Loretta Block]
 Midwood 49:  Farm Girl by George Cassidy
 Midwood 50:  Ladies' Masseur by James Harvey
 1960 Midwood 51: All About Annette, by Alan Marshall
 Midwood 52:  Meet Marilyn by Sloane Britain
 Midwood 53:  The Unashamed by March Hastings
 Midwood 54:  Lana by Joan Ellis
 1960 Midwood 55: 21 Gay Street: An Original Novel, by Sheldon Lord — later reprinted as Midwood Y159
 1960 Midwood 56: The Blonde: An Original Novel, by Peggy Swenson
 Midwood 56:  The Blonde by Peggy Swenson
 Midwood 57:  Insatiable by Sloane Britain
 Midwood 58:  Sabrina And The Senator by Nick Vendor
 Midwood 59:  A Twilight Affair by James Harvey
 Midwood 60:  All The Way by Mike Avallone
 Midwood 61:  Flame by Joan Ellis
 Midwood 62:  Sally by Alan Marshall
 Midwood 63:  The Unfortunate Flesh by Randy Salem
 Midwood 64:  Million Dollar Mistress by Clyde Allison
 1960 Midwood 65: Nurse Carolyn, by Loren Beauchamp
 Midwood 66:  Sin School by Don Holliday
 Midwood 67:  A Touch Of Depravity by Paul V. Russo
 1961 Midwood 68: There Oughta Be a Law! by Harry Shorten and Al Fagaly
 Midwood 69:  Liza's Apartment by Joan Ellis
 Midwood 70:  Sin On Wheels by Loren Beauchamp
 Midwood 71:  A Woman by Bruce Elliott
 Midwood 72:  The Path Between by Jay Warren
 Midwood 73:  The Sex Peddlers by Clyde Allison
 1960 Midwood 74: Connie: An Original Novel, by Loren Beauchamp
 Midwood 74:  Connie by Loren Beauchamp
 Midwood 75:  Common-Law Wife by Karl Kramer
 Midwood 76:  Pleasure Girl by Joan Ellis
 Midwood 77:  Bucks County Report by Stuart James
 Midwood 78:  Restless Virgin by Paul V. Russo
 Midwood 79:  Your Sins And Mine by George Parksmith
 Midwood 80:  The Jealous And The Free by March Hastings
 Midwood 81:  School For Sex by Arnold English
 Midwood 82:  These Curious Pleasures by Sloane Britain
 Midwood 83:  One Flesh by Paul V. Russo
 Midwood 84:  Lament For A Virgin by Art Serra
 Midwood 85:  Silky by Dallas Mayo
 Midwood 86:  The Fires Within by Loren Beauchamp
 Midwood 87:  Drive-In Girl by R.C. Gold
 Midwood 88:  Stag Starlet by Paul V. Russo
 Midwood 89:  Middle Of Time by James Wyckoff
 Midwood 90:  Step Down To Darkness by David Highsmith
 Midwood 91:  Sex Behavior Of The American Housewife by W.D. Sprague
 Midwood 92:  The Weekend by Thomas Cox
 Midwood 93:  A Moment's Pleasure by Clyde Merrick
 Midwood 94:  This Yielding Flesh by Paul V. Russo
 Midwood 95:  Gay Interlude by Carol Clanton
 Midwood 96:  Jews Without Money by Michael Gold
 Midwood 97:  Desire Under The Sun by George McGhee
 Midwood 98:  Kitten by Dallas Mayo
 Midwood 99:  Redhead by Joan Ellis
 Midwood 100:  A Need For Love by Dallas Mayo
 Midwood 101:  Morals Charge by Paul Hunter
 Midwood 102:  And When She Was Bad by Loren Beauchamp
 Midwood 103:  69 Barrow Street by Sheldon Lord
 Midwood 104:  Judge Not My Sins by Stuart James
 Midwood 105:  All My Pretty Ones by Roger Hall
 Midwood 106:  Child Bride by Al James
 Midwood 107:  The Hunger And The Hate by Joan Ellis
 Midwood 108:  Without Shame by Paul V. Russo
 Midwood 109:  Torment by Don Holliday
 1961 Midwood F110: The Unloved: An Original Novel, by Peggy Swenson
 Midwood 111:  The Lover by Al James
 Midwood 112:  A Girl Like That by John Plunkett
 Midwood 113:  Mulatto by Joan Ellis
 Midwood 114:  Corrupt Woman by Paul V. Russo
 Midwood 115:  Married Mistress by Orrie Hitt
 Midwood 116:  So Wild by Mike Skinner
 Midwood 117:  For Value Received by Will Laurence
 Midwood 118:  This Girl by Jason Hytes
 Midwood 119:  That Other Hunger by Sloane Britain
 Midwood 120:  Women In Prison by Mike Avallone
 1961 Midwood 121: Of Shame and Joy: An Original Novel, by Sheldon Lord
 Midwood 122:  House Of Sin by Dallas Mayo
 Midwood 123:  Numbers Girl by Linda Michaels
 Midwood 124:  Motel Hostess by Rick Richards
 Midwood 125:  The Lowest Sins by Joe Castro
 Midwood 126:  Pound Of Flesh by Jason Hytes
 Midwood 127:  Weak And Wicked by Al James
 Midwood 128:  Intimate by Martha Marsden
 Midwood 129:  All My Lovers by Alan Marshall
 Midwood 130:  Norma by George Glennon
 Midwood 131:  Carla by Sheldon Lord
 Midwood 132:  Stag Stripper by Mike Avallone
 Midwood 133:  The Halfbreed by Al James
 Midwood 134:  The Outcasts by March Hastings
 Midwood 135:  The Little Black Book by Mike Avallone
 Midwood 136:  The Snows Of Summer by Alice Brennan
 Midwood 137:  Henry's Wife by Gordon Mitchell
 Midwood 138:  Stag Model by James Harvey
 Midwood 139:  In The Shadows by Joan Ellis
 Midwood 140:  August Heat by Roger Allen
 Midwood 141:  Love Like A Shadow by Kimberly Kemp
 Midwood 142:  Woman Doctor by Sloane Britain
 Midwood 143:  Con Girl by Unknown
 Midwood 144:  I Know The Score by Ort Louis
 1962 Midwood 145: Strange Delights, by Loren Beauchamp
 Midwood 146:  Sinners In White by Mike Avallone
 Midwood 147:  Man Hungry by Alan Marshall
 Midwood 148:  Sin A La Carte by Loren Beauchamp
 Midwood 149:  Apprentice Virgin [aka 'Backstage Love'] by Alan Marshall
 Midwood 150:  Mail Order Sex by Orrie Hitt
 Midwood 151:  Jill Harvey by Paul V. Russo
 Midwood 152:  Office Tramp by Sidney Porcelain
 Midwood 153:  Skin Deep by Walter Dyer
 Midwood 154:  The Lesbian In Our Society by W.D. Sprague
 Midwood 155:  Rita by Jason Hytes
 Midwood 156:  The Flesh Is Willing by Dorcas Knight
 Midwood 157:  The Strange Compulsion Of Laura M. by Joan Ellis
 Midwood 158:  Scandal by Dallas Mayo
 Midwood 159:  21 Gay Street by Sheldon Lord
 Midwood 160:  The Blonde by Peggy Swenson
 Midwood 161:  Girls In Trouble by Linda Michaels
 Midwood 162:  Perfume And Pain by Kemberly Kemp
 Midwood 163:  The Drifter by March Hastings
 Midwood 164:  Ripe by Rick Richards
 Midwood 165:  Puta [aka 'Born To Be Bad'] by Sheldon Lord
 Midwood 166:  What Girls Will Do [aka 'All the Girls Were Willing'] by Alan Marshall
 Midwood 167:  Sex Before Six by Jason Hytes
 Midwood 168:  Flight Hostess Rogers by Mike Avallone
 Midwood 169:  Gay Scene [aka 'No Men Allowed'] by Joan Ellis
 1962 Midwood 170:  The Passer by Sam Merwin Jr.
 Midwood 171:  The Undoing Of Jenny by Mike Skinner
 Midwood 172:  Tender Torment by Randy Salem
 Midwood 173:  Sex With A Twist by Joan Ellis
 Midwood 174:  Seduction By Appointment by Rick Richards
 Midwood 175:  Forever Amy by Amy Harris
 Midwood 176:  The Doctor & The Dike [aka 'Secret Session'] by Jason Hytes
 Midwood 177:  Ladder Of Flesh by Sloane Britain
 Midwood 178:  A Man In Her House by William Johnston
 Midwood 179:  Chico's Women by March Hastings
 Midwood 180:  Prisoner Of My Past by Edie Fisher
 Midwood 181:  Operation - Sex by Kimberly Kemp
 Midwood 182:  Campus Jungle by Joan Ellis
 Midwood 183:  A Twilight Affair by James Harvey
 Midwood 184:  All The Way by Mike Avallone
 Midwood 185:  Passionately Yours, Eve by Paul Gregory
 Midwood 186:  TV Tramps by Walter Dyer
 Midwood 187:  Abnormal by Rick Richards
 Midwood 188:  Twice With Julie by Jason Hytes
 Midwood 189:  Sex Kitten by Mike Avallone
 Midwood 190:  The Craving by Dallas Mayo
 Midwood 191:  Unnatural by Sloan Britton
 Midwood 192:  The Sex Game by Mike Skinner
 Midwood 193:  Lady Wrestler by James Harvey
 Midwood 194:  Daughter Of Shame by Joan Ellis
 Midwood 195:  One Way Ticket by Jason Hytes
 Midwood 196:  The Soft Sin by Randy Salem
 Midwood 197:  Come One-Come All by Jason Hytes
 Midwood 198:  Voluptuous Voyage by Dallas Mayo
 Midwood 199:  Thorn Of Evil by Max Collier
 Midwood 200:  Easy by Peggy Swenson
 Midwood 201:  Savage Surrender by March Hastings
 Midwood 202:  The Platinum Trap by Mike Avallone
 Midwood 203:  Birth Of A Tramp by Amy Harris
 Midwood 204:  Web Of Flesh by Mal Chance
 Midwood 205:  Never Love A Call Girl by Mike Avallone
 Midwood 206:  Campus Sex Club by Loren Beauchamp
 Midwood 207:  Over-Exposed by Jason Hytes
 Midwood 208:  By Flesh Alone by March Hastings
 Midwood 209:  Carrie Corrupted by Rock Logano
 Midwood 210:  Intimate Nurse by Kimberly Kemp
 Midwood 211:  Island Of Sin by Dallas Mayo
 Midwood 212:  Touch Me Gently by Amy Harris
 Midwood 213:  Sleep-In Maid [aka 'Cindy'] by Linda Michaels
 Midwood 214:  Lap Of Luxury by Kimberly Kemp
 Midwood 215:  Counter Girl by Amy Harris
 Midwood 216:  Wait Your Turn by Jason Hytes
 Midwood 217:  Appointment For Sin by Paul V. Russo
 Midwood 218:  Gay Girl by Joan Ellis
 Midwood 219:  The Sex Between by Randy Salem
 Midwood 220:  Flight Into Sin by Mike Skinner
 Midwood 221:  Yesterday's Virgin by Jason Hytes
 Midwood 222:  Degraded Women by James Harvey
 Midwood 223:  Pleasure Lodge by Peggy Swenson
 Midwood 224:  Whip Of Desire by March Hastings
 Midwood 225:  Unnatural Urge by Joe Black & Orrie Hitt
 1962 Midwood 226:  Wayward Widow by Loren Beauchamp — later reprinted as Midwood F226: Wayward Widow: Free Sample (1968)
 Midwood 227:  Resort Secretary by Arnold English
 Midwood 228:  The Girl Downstairs by Rock Anthony
 Midwood 229:  This Is Elaine by Jason Hytes
 Midwood 230:  Take Me by John B. Thompson
 Midwood 231:  The Wild Week by Jason Hytes + Imitation Lovers by March Hastings
 Midwood 232:  The Payoff by Max Collier
 Midwood 233:  Immoral Lady by Russell Gage
 Midwood 234:  Forbidden Sex by Joan Ellis
 Midwood 235:  The Passionate Virgin by Mike Skinner
 Midwood 236:  Wild Honey by Don Karl
 Midwood 237:  Never Enough by Jason Hytes
 Midwood 238:  The Hot Canary by Joan Ellis
 Midwood 239:  Sudden Hunger by Paul Dodge
 Midwood 240:  The Soft Way by March Hastings
 Midwood 241:  The Pleasure And The Pain by Ort Louis
 Midwood 242:  Don't Bet On Blondes by Walter Dyer
 Midwood 243:  Illicit Interlude by Kimberly Kemp
 Midwood 244:  By Her Body Betrayed by Rock Anthony
 Midwood 245:  The Sex Plan by Philip Elder
 Midwood 246:  Swing Low Sweet Sinner by Jason Hytes
 Midwood 247:  Sea Nymph by Peggy Swenson
 Midwood 248:  Horizontal Secretary [aka 'I'll Be Good - Tomorrow'] by Amy Harris
 Midwood 249:  None But The Wicked by D.W. Craig
 Midwood 250:  A Rage Within by March Hastings
 Midwood 251:  Pagan by Paul V. Russo
 Midwood 252:  Strange Breed by Aldo Lucchesi
 Midwood 253:  Camera Club Model by James Harvey
 Midwood 254:  Without Shame by Jason Hytes
 Midwood 255:  Again And Again by March Hastings
 Midwood 256:  A Bit Of Fluff by Kimberly Kemp
 Midwood 257:  Once Too Often by Joan Ellis
 Midwood 258:  Something Special by Richard Donalds
 1963 Midwood 259: The Cruel Touch, by Alan Marshall
 Midwood 260:  The Path Between by Jay Warren
 Midwood 261:  One Step More by Jess Draper
 Midwood 262:  Girl In The Middle by John Burton Thompson
 Midwood 263:  The Mark Of A Man by Max Collier
 Midwood 264:  Erica by James Harvey
 Midwood 265:  All Of Me by Amy Harris
 Midwood 266:  Restless by Greg Hamilton
 Midwood 267:  Everybody Welcome [aka 'The Girl Next Door'] by Dallas Mayo
 Midwood 268:  The Unashamed by March Hastings
 Midwood 269:  The Teaser by Jason Hytes
 Midwood 270:  Sign Here For Sin by Richard Donalds
 Midwood 271:  Her Private Hell by March Hastings
 Midwood 272:  Rusty by Jess Draper
 Midwood 273:  Any Man Will Do by Greg Hamilton
 1963 Midwood F274: Pajama Party, by Peggy Swenson
 Midwood 275:  Irma La Douce by Wilder Billy & I.A.L. Diamond
 Midwood 276:  Sin On Wheels by Loren Beauchamp
 Midwood 277:  Perfumed by Jason Hytes + Pampered by Kimberly Kemp
 Midwood 278:  Fringe Benefits by Rock Anthony
 Midwood 279:  Hold Me Tight by Joan Ellis
 Midwood 280:  Take Care Of Me by John Turner
 Midwood 281:  Say When by Max Collier
 Midwood 282:  Party Girls by Paul V. Russo
 Midwood 283:  Honeysuckle by Randy Salem
 Midwood 284:  Meet Marilyn by Sloane Britain
 Midwood 285:  Whatever She Wanted by Jess Draper
 Midwood 286:  One Of The Girls by Richard Mezatesta
 Midwood 287:  Soft In The Shadows by John Turner
 Midwood 288:  Night After Night by Will Saxon
 Midwood 289:  Nine To Five by Joseph Commings
 Midwood 290:  The Intruder by Judd Powell
 Midwood 291:  Lesbianism Around The World by R. Leighton Hasselrodt
 Midwood 292:  Nurse Carolyn [aka 'Maternity Ward'] by Loren Beauchamp
 Midwood 293:  Too Young To Marry by Joan Ellis
 Midwood 294:  Above And Beyond by Richard Mullins
 Midwood 295:  The Spy by Paul Thomas
 Midwood 296:  The Heat Of Day by March Hastings
 Midwood 297:  The Captive by John Turner
 Midwood 298:  Made To Order by Greg Hamilton
 Midwood 299:  Nothing To Lose by Kimberly Kemp
 Midwood 300:  Shadow Dance by Barbara Brooks + After Hours by Robbie McAndrews
 Midwood 301:  Devil's Workshop by Stuart James
 Midwood 302:  A Time Of Torment by Jason Hytes
 Midwood 303:  Sure Thing by Max Collier
 Midwood 304:  Shameless by John B. Thompson
 Midwood 305:  The Come On by Vin Fields
 Midwood 306:  Man Handled by E.L. Scobie
 Midwood 307:  No Way Back by Russell Trainer
 Midwood 308:  Carole Came Back by John Turner
 Midwood 309:  With Eyes Wide Open by Rock Anthony
 Midwood 310:  The Delicate Vice by Sloan Britton
 1963 Midwood F311: Unlike Others, by Valerie Taylor
 Midwood 312:  Tear Gas And Hungry Dogs by William Sloan
 Midwood 313:  Man Trap by Brad Curtis
 Midwood 314:  Monica by Greg Hamilton
 Midwood 315:  When Lights Are Low by Dallas Mayo
 Midwood 316:  The French Way by John Lamoureux
 Midwood 317:  Not Since Eve by Richard Donalds
 Midwood 318:  Stronger Than Love by Jess Draper
 Midwood 319:  Diane by Max Collier
 Midwood 320:  Insatiable by Sloane Britain
 Midwood 321:  Harlot In Heels by Greg Hamilton + Lady Love by Jason Hytes
 Midwood 322:  No Sense Of Shame by Dan Brennan
 Midwood 323:  Just The Two Of Us by Barbara Brooks by William Coons
 Midwood 324:  So Eager To Please by Greg Hamilton
 Midwood 325:  The Sinners by John Turner
 Midwood 326:  The Honeymoon Habit by Grant Corgan
 Midwood 327:  Spring Fever by Ludwell Hughes
 Midwood 328:  Image Of Evil by Paul V. Russo
 Midwood 329:  Return To Lesbos by Valerie Taylor
 Midwood 330:  Two Must Die by Henry Kane
 Midwood 331:  Different by Kimberly Kemp
 Midwood 332:  Day In, Day Out by Joan Ellis
 Midwood 333:  Teacher's Pet by Mark Clements
 Midwood 334:  The Vice Dolls by John Stark
 Midwood 335:  Anatomy Of A Mistress by Brad Curtis
 Midwood 336:  Nude In A Red Chair by Amanda Moore
 Midwood 337:  Have Heels, Will Travel by Andrew Wynne
 Midwood 338:  Immoral by Jason Hytes + Forbidden by Kimberly Kemp
 Midwood 339:  Old Enough by David Martell
 1963 Midwood F340: Nikki, by Don Rico
 Midwood 341:  Portrait In Flesh by Greg Hamilton
 Midwood 342:  The Baby-Sitter by Vin Fields
 Midwood 343:  Girl's Dormitory by Joan Ellis
 Midwood 344:  Switch Partners by Shelia Faye
 Midwood 345:  Marriage On The Rocks by John Nemec
 1963 Midwood F346: A World Without Men, by Valerie Taylor
 Midwood 347:  Friends & Lovers by Oscar Pinkus
 Midwood 348:  The Pagan Empress by Kevin Matthews
 Midwood 349:  High School Hellion by Joan Ellis + Campus Cat Pack by Barbara Brooks
 Midwood 350:  The Spice Of Life by Grant Corgan
 Midwood 351:  Another Kind Of Love [aka 'Raped Virgin'] by Greg Hamilton
 Midwood 352:  A World All Their Own by Kimberly Kemp
 Midwood 353:  Never Say No by J.L. Bouma
 Midwood 354:  Love Or Lust by Mark Clements
 Midwood 355:  Anything Under The Sun by Michael Spaulding
 Midwood 356:  For Services Rendered by Brad Curtis
 Midwood 357:  Where There's Smoke by Michael Burgess
 Midwood 358:  Kitten by Dallas Mayo
 Midwood 359:  Duet by Laura Du Champ
 Midwood 360:  After Class by Joan Ellis
 Midwood 361:  Love Starved by Russell Trainer
 Midwood 362:  Woman On Fire by Brian O'Bannon
 Midwood 363:  So Strange A Love by Danni Sherwood
 Midwood 364:  Early To Bed by Mark Clements
 Midwood 365:  The Yes Girl by Amanda Moore
 Midwood 366:  Tall, Blonde And Evil by Greg Hamilton
 Midwood 367:  His For The Taking by Jess Draper
 Midwood 368:  One Last Fling by Jason Hytes
 Midwood 369:  
 Midwood 370:  Cry Into The Wind by Eugenie Gaffney
 Midwood 371:  Pretty Puppet by Dallas Mayo
 Midwood 372:  That Kind Of Wife by Greg Hamilton
 Midwood 373:  We Two by Ann Brady Clay
 Midwood 374:  Impatient by David Lawrence
 Midwood 375:  The Street Walker by Jason Hytes
 Midwood 376:  Only In Secret by D.W. Craig
 Midwood 377:  The Teenage Trap by R.C. Gold
 Midwood 378:  His Daughter's Friend by Russell Trainer
 Midwood 379:  Corrupt Woman by Paul V. Russo
 Midwood 380:  Love Toy by Frank G. Harris
 Midwood 381:  The House Guest by Kimberly Kemp
 Midwood 382:  Afternoons At Three by Greg Hamilton
 Midwood 383:  A Lesson In Love by Marjorie Price
 Midwood 384:  Swing Shift by Grant Corgan
 Midwood 385:  Man Tamer by Brad Curtis
 Midwood 386:  The Third Street by Joan Ellis
 Midwood 387:  Home Before Six by Alix York
 Midwood 388:  Playgirl by Michael Burgess
 Midwood 389:  Dance Of Desire by Paul V. Russo
 Midwood 390:  Remember Me? by Eugenie Gaffney
 Midwood 391:  Goodbye, Darling by Laura Duchamp
 Midwood 392:  Chains Of Silk by John Balmer
 Midwood 393:  The Adulteress by James Harvey
 Midwood 394:  The Unloved by Peggy Swenson

MIDWOOD - TOWER SERIES 394-339 

 Midwood 34-395:  The Dangerous Age by Joan Ellis + Bad By Choice by Jason Hytes
 Midwood 32-396:  Talk Of The Town by Joan Ellis
 Midwood 32-397:  Joy by David Lawrence
 Midwood 32-398:  Encore by Laura Duchamp
 Midwood 32-399:  Good Time Girl by Alix York
 Midwood 32-400:  Too Late For Tears by D.W. Craig
 Midwood 32-401:  Divorcee by Joan Vincent
 Midwood 32-402:  Warm And Willing by Jill Emerson
 Midwood 32-403:  Male Call by Max Collier
 Midwood 32-404:  Overtime Affair by Jason Hytes
 Midwood 42-405:  Love A La Carte by George St. George
 Midwood 42-406:  The Organization by Ovid Demaris
 Midwood 42-407:  Before I Die by Lionel White
 Midwood 42-408:  Cry Into The Wind by Eugine Gaffney
 Midwood 34-409:  Trick Or Treat by Marjorie Price + Split Level Sin by Jason Hytes
 Midwood 32-410:  Hellcat by Barbara Brooks
 Midwood 32-411:  A Labor Of Love by Kimberly Kemp
 Midwood 32-412:  Hold That Pose by Sheila Faye
 Midwood 32-413:  Thank You, Call Again by Laura Duchamp
 Midwood 32-414:  The Roommates by Mark Clements
 Midwood 32-415:  One After Another by Vin Fields
 Midwood 32-416:  His To Command by Max Collier
 Midwood 32-417:  Campus Kittens by Joan Ellis
 Midwood 32-418:  Silky by Dallas Mayo
 Midwood 32-419:  The Other Extreme by Laura Duchamp
 Midwood 32-420:  Just This Once by Michael Burgess
 Midwood 32-421:  The Easy Way by Dallas Mayo
 Midwood 32-422:  Pleasure Island by Alix York
 Midwood 32-423:  Follow The Leader by Greg Hamilton
 Midwood 32-424:  Gang Girl by Joan Ellis
 Midwood 32-425:  Private Property by Brad Curtis
 Midwood 32-426:  Party Time by Kimberly Kemp
 1964 Midwood 32-427:  Journey To Fulfillment by Valerie Taylor
 Midwood 32-428:  Sex Before Six by Jason Hytes
 Midwood 44-429:  The Hard Sell by Lee Costigan
 Midwood 43-430:  Catherine The Great by Kevin Mathews
 Midwood 42-431:  The Killing (movie tie-in title of the novel Clean Break) by Lionel White
 Midwood 42-432:  Trail's End by John S. Daniels
 Midwood 32-433:  The Time And Place by Laura Duchamp
 Midwood 32-434:  Holiday Weekend by Mark Clements
 Midwood 32-435:  Into The Fire by Paul V. Russo
 Midwood 32-436:  Three Of A Kind by Joan Ellis
 Midwood 32-437:  Miss Dream Girl by Jay Hart
 Midwood 32-438:  Woman Aflame by Connie Nelson
 Midwood 32-439:  Love Thief by Michael Burgess
 Midwood 32-440:  For Want Of Love by Amanda Moore
 Midwood 32-441:  Night Shift by Brad Curtis
 Midwood 32-442:  The Drifter by March Hastings
 Midwood 43-443:  A Summer In Spain by Richard Lortz
 Midwood 43-444:  Hemingway's Paris by Morrill Cody
 Midwood 43-445:  He Ran All the Way by Sam Ross
 Midwood 42-446:  Apache Landing by Robert J. Hogan
 Midwood 34-447:  And When She Was Bad by Barbra Brooks + Strangers For Lovers by Jay Hart
 Midwood 32-448:  Coming Out Party by Kimberly Kemp
 Midwood 32-449:  Little Girl Lost by Greg Hamilton
 Midwood 32-450:  Daytime In Suburbia by Susannah West
 Midwood 32-451:  A Shameless Need by Barbara Brooks
 Midwood 32-452:  Out Of Control by Mark Clements
 Midwood 32-453:  Tourist Trap by Will Newbury
 Midwood 32-454:  Master Pieces by Howard Kandel & Don Satram
 Midwood 32-455:  The Love Pirate by Alix York
 Midwood 32-456:  No Men Allowed [aka 'Gay Scene'] by Joan Ellis
 Midwood 34-457:  Executive Sweet by Joan Ellis + The Soft Sell by Connie Nelson
 Midwood 43-458:  Why Are You Single? by Hilda Holland
 Midwood 43-459:  Unclouded Summer by Alec Waugh
 Midwood 43-460:  Can A Mermaid Kill? by Thomas B. Dewey
 Midwood 43-461:  Time To Come by August Derleth
 Midwood 34-462:  Forbidden Interlude by Toni Stevens + Just You, Just Me by Barbara Brooks
 Midwood 32-463:  Sexual Behavior Of The American Housewife by W.D. Sprague
 Midwood 32-464:  Open House by Joan Ellis
 Midwood 32-465:  Pagan Summer by Dallas Mayo
 Midwood 32-466:  Wayward Wife by Mark Clements
 Midwood 32-467:  Penthouse Party by Gerald Kramer
 Midwood 32-468:  The Highest Bidder by Vin Fields
 Midwood 32-469:  Never Too Young by D.W. Craig
 Midwood 32-470:  Punish Lessons by Amanda Moore
 Midwood 32-471:  One For The Road by Jason Hytes
 Midwood 43-472:  The Bird's Nest by Shirley Jackson
 Midwood 43-473:  The Buccaneers by P.K. Kemp & Christopher Lloyd
 Midwood 42-474:  Objsect Of Jealousy by Arthur Rutledge
 Midwood 43-475:  Helen Of Troy by Kevin Mathews
 Midwood 34-476:  Two Timer by Connie Nelson + The Mate Exchange by Frank Harris
 Midwood 34-477:  Small Town Sinner by Merry Woods + Thrill Hungry by Brian O'Bannon
 Midwood 32-478:  The Swap Set by Max Collier
 Midwood 32-479:  Private Party [aka 'The Waitress'] by Kimberly Kemp
 Midwood 32-480:  Trouble Maker by Russell Trainer
 Midwood 32-481:  Room Service by Laura Duchamp
 Midwood 32-482:  Ask Me No Questions by Carter McCord
 Midwood 32-483:  Overnight Guest by Ludwell Hughes
 Midwood 32-484:  Finders Keepers by Sloan Britain
 Midwood 32-485:  Jailbait by Jason Hytes
 Midwood 43-486:  The Billboard Madonna by Elleston Trevor
 Midwood ??-487:  
 Midwood 43-488:  The Tired Spy by David Stone
 Midwood 42-489:  The Hunted by John S. Daniels
 Midwood 34-490:  Problem Child by Vin Fields + The Switch by Joan Ellis
 Midwood 34-491:  The Wrong Kind by Gerald Kramer + Never Ask Why by Amanda Moore
 Midwood 32-492:  Handy Man by Mark Clements
 Midwood 32-493:  Christine by John Turner
 Midwood 32-494:  The Beauty Game by Emory Paine
 Midwood 32-495:  Down And Out by Les Masters
 Midwood 32-496:  The Cool Coeds by Joan Ellis
 Midwood 32-497:  The Sleek And Sensual by Max Collier
 Midwood 32-498:  The Nymphomaniac by Jeffery Williams
 Midwood 32-499:  Satan In Silk by Paul V. Russo
 Midwood 44-500:  The Wandering Husband by Hyman Spotnitz & Lucy Freeman
 Midwood 42-501:  History Was Made In Bed by Paul Croville
 Midwood 42-502:  Five Day Nightmare by Fredric Brown
 Midwood 43-503:  The Mind Game by A.E. Van Vogt
 Midwood 34-504:  Bedtime Story by Laura Duchamp + The Softest Sin by Ludwell Hughes
 Midwood 34-505:  The Voluptuary by Connie Nelson + One For All by Merry Woods
 Midwood 32-506:  Kid Sister by Mark Clements
 Midwood 32-507:  Exotic Escapade by Paul V. Russo
 Midwood 32-508:  Queen Bee by Will Newbury
 Midwood 32-509:  Pretty Please by Joan Ellis
 Midwood 32-510:  Obsession by Emory Paine
 Midwood 32-511:  Mainly For Wives by Robert Chartham
 Midwood 32-512:  The Lady Awaits by Greg Hamilton
 Midwood 32-513:  One Night Stand [aka 'Scandal'] by Dallas Mayo
 Midwood 43-514:  The Innocents by Edward D. Radin
 Midwood 43-515:  Gemini by Theodora Keogh
 Midwood 43-516:  
 Midwood 43-517:  Affair At Quala by Thomas Helmore
 Midwood 34-518:  On Call by Connie Nelson + The Pick-Up by Brad Curtis
 Midwood 34-519:  None The Wiser by Clement Haney + Change Partners by Grant Corgan
 Midwood 32-520:  Sooner Or Later by Joan Ellis
 Midwood 32-521:  The Rebel by Emory Paine
 Midwood 32-522:  Winner Take All by Mark Clements
 Midwood 32-523:  Alone At Last by Paul V. Russo
 Midwood 32-524:  The Moonlighters by Gil Herbert
 Midwood 32-525:  Taboo by Barbara Brooks
 Midwood 32-526:  Anything Goes by Marjorie Price
 Midwood 32-527:  Secret Session [aka 'The Doctor & The Dike'] by Jason Hytes
 Midwood 43-528:  Once Upon A Friday by Phillips Moore
 Midwood 43-529:  Sex And So What by Virginia Sweet Purdom
 Midwood ??-530:  
 Midwood 43-531:  Dragon's Island by Jack Williams
 Midwood 34-532:  Coming Of Age by Gerald Kramer + Handle With Care by Barbara Brooks
 Midwood 34-533:  Runaway by Connie Nelson + Now Or Never by Clement Haney
 Midwood 32-534:  The Boss's Daughter by Mark Clements
 Midwood 32-535:  Temporary Secretary by Joan Ellis
 Midwood 32-536:  The Love Goddess by Brad Curtis
 Midwood 32-537:  Mock Marriage by Kenneth Shaw
 Midwood 32-538:  Model Mistress by Laura Duchamp
 Midwood 32-539:  Honey Child by Greg Hamilton
 Midwood 32-540:  The Unfaithful Wife by Jeffery Williams
 Midwood 32-541:  Twice With Julie by Jason Hytes
 Midwood 44-542:  The Deep Six by Martin Dibner
 Midwood 43-543:  Rebels In The Streets by Kitty Hanson
 Midwood 43-544:  A Fire In His Hand by Michael Grieg
 Midwood ??-545:  
 Midwood 34-546:  Wandering Wives by Simon Lansing + Suburban Affair by Connie Nelson
 Midwood 34-547:  Only In Shadows by Merry Woods + The Velvet Trap by Toni Stevens
 Midwood 34-548:  The Swinger by Barbara Brooks + Not So Nice by Clement Haney
 Midwood 32-549:  Wild And Wicked by Laura Duchamp
 Midwood 32-550:  Enough Of Sorrow by Jill Emerson
 Midwood 32-551:  Queen Of Hearts by Carter McCord
 Midwood 32-552:  Surprise Party by Ludwell Hughes
 Midwood 32-553:  Late At Night by Merry Woods
 Midwood 32-554:  Campus Jungle by Joan Ellis
 Midwood 32-555:  Over-Exposed by Jason Hytes
 Midwood 44-556:  Bogey - The Man, The Actor, The Legend by Jonah Ruddy & Jonathan Hill
 Midwood ??-557:  
 Midwood 42-558:  More Bitter Than Death by Kate Wilhelm
 Midwood 32-559:  Free And Easy by Greg Hamilton
 Midwood 34-560:  Force Of Habit by Barbra Brooks + A Twilight Sin by Rhoda Peterson
 Midwood 34-561:  Lady Of Leisure by Connie Nelson + Never Let Me Go by Toni Stevens
 Midwood 34-562:  Not So Innocent by William Moore + Sugar And Spice by Joan Ellis
 Midwood 32-563:  Boss Lady by Ursula Grant
 Midwood 32-564:  The Strange One by Greg Hamilton
 Midwood 32-565:  Three Women by Harry Gibbs
 Midwood 32-566:  Don't Tell Anyone by Joan Ellis
 Midwood 32-567:  Strictly Business by Eunice Brandon
 Midwood 32-568:  Man Crazy by Max Collier
 Midwood 32-569:  Rich And Reckless by Toni Stevens
 Midwood 43-570:  One More Time by Casey Scott
 Midwood 43-571:  The Project by Andrew Sinclair
 Midwood 43-572:  The Cave Of The Chinese Skeltons by Jack Seward
 Midwood 42-573:  Shadow At Dunster Hall by Eugenia Desmond
 Midwood 34-574:  Girl About Town by Ursula Grant + Do Unto Others by Toni Stevens
 Midwood 34-575:  Sorority Sisters by Connie Nelson + Campus Affair by Amanda Moore
 Midwood 34-576:  Girl About Town by Ursula Grant + Do Unto Others by Toni Stevens
 Midwood 34-577:  Only After Dark by Peter Conrad + Accent On Passion by William Moore
 Midwood 32-578:  All Together Now by Dallas Mayo
 Midwood 32-579:  Country Girl by Joan Ellis
 Midwood 32-580:  The Golden Greed by Brad Curtis
 Midwood 34-581:  Angel Face by Barbara Brooks + House Pet by John Balmer
 Midwood 34-582:  Sin-Suburban Style by Grant Corgan + The Games Wives Play by Rhoda Peterson
 Midwood 34-583:  Easy Come, Easy Go by Connie Nelson + From Bed To Worse by Joseph Tell
 Midwood 32-584:  The Last Resort [aka 'Secret Cravings'] by Kimberly Kemp
 Midwood 32-585:  Back Seat Bunny by Greg Hamilton
 Midwood 32-586:  Sweet Revenge by Merry Woods
 Midwood 32-587:  Heat Spell by William Moore
 Midwood 32-588:  Faculty Wife by Joan-Ellis
 Midwood 32-589:  The Body Beautiful by Carl DeMarco
 Midwood 44-590:  Venus In Furs - The Black Czarina [aka 'The Long-Suppressed Erotic Tales'] by Leopold von Sacher-Masoch 
 Midwood ??-591:  
 Midwood 43-592:  Lost Island by Graham McInnis
 Midwood 42-593:  Mistress Of Farrondale by Dorethea Nile
 Midwood ??-594:  
 Midwood 34-595:  Party, Party by C.P. West + Dutch Treat by Jeffrey Williams
 Midwood 34-596:  Wanton Widow by Connie Nelson + Two Times Two by Barbara Brooks
 Midwood 34-597:  Pretty Playmate by Will Newbury + Every So Often by Gus Stevens
 Midwood 32-598:  Live And Let Live by Brad Curtis
 Midwood 32-599:  Free And Easy by Greg Hamilton
 Midwood 32-600:  Switch Time by Merry Woods
 Midwood 32-601:  Come And Be My Slave by Gerald Kramer
 Midwood 32-602:  No Last Names by Joan Ellis
 Midwood 32-603:  So Dark A Desire by William Moore
 Midwood 32-604:  Give And Take by Cynthia Sydney
 Midwood 44-605:  The Mariage Bed by Albert Ellis & Robert Harper
 Midwood 42-606:  The Mists Of Mourning by Suzanne Somers
 Midwood 42-607:  Spellbound by Claire Vincent
 Midwood ??-608:  
 Midwood 34-609:  Season Of Sin by Charles Castleman + Daytime Lovers by Connie Nelson
 Midwood 34-610:  Naughty But Nice by Joan Ellis + From Me To You by John Hayes
 Midwood 34-611:  Lost And Found by Cynthia Sydney + The Go-Go Girls by Leslie Roote
 Midwood 34-612:  Perfumed by Jason Hytes + The Wild Week by Jason Hytes
 Midwood 32-613:  Man Hunt by Mark Clements
 Midwood 32-614:  Girl On The Run by Jean Holbrook
 Midwood 32-615:  Sweet But Sinful by Emory Paine
 Midwood 32-616:  The Speed Set by S.R. Fontaine
 Midwood 32-617:  Hide And Seek by Norman A. King
 Midwood 32-618:  Snow Bunnies by Joan Ellis
 Midwood 43-619:  The Summer Ghosts by Alexis Lykiard
 Midwood 43-620:  Jadoo by Joel Keel
 Midwood 42-621:  The Doomsday Planet by Harl Vincent
 Midwood 42-622:  Deadline by Dan J. Stevens
 Midwood 34-623:  Hip Chick by Joan Ellis + Darers Go First by Randy Baker
 Midwood 34-624:  Bold And Brazen by Leslie Roote + Private Secretary by Merry Woods
 Midwood 34-625:  Search For Sin by Charles Castleman + Night Shift Nurse by Sidney Wilson
 Midwood 34-626:  Honky-Tonk Girl by Jean Holbrook + The Boiling Point by Connie Nelson
 Midwood 32-627:  Too Young, Too Wild by Brad Curtis
 Midwood 32-628:  Norma Born For Trouble by George Glennon
 Midwood 32-629:  The Face Of Evil by Robert Bruce
 Midwood ??-630:  
 Midwood 32-631:  The Discontented by Max Collier
 Midwood 32-632:  Label Her Shameless by John B. Thompson
 Midwood 34-633:  High School Hellion by Joan Ellis + The Dangerous Age by Gerald Kramer
 Midwood 34-634:  All About A Tease by Terry Shaffer + Babe In The Woods by J.C. Comstock
 Midwood 34-635:  Goodbye Innocence by Norman A. King + Big City Campus by Linda Micheals
 Midwood 34-636:  Midnight Mistress by John Hayes + Private Pleasures by Toni Stevens
 Midwood 34-637:  Call Me Kitten by Cory Mallord + Fair Exchange by Leslie Roote
 Midwood 33-638:  Never The Same Again by Merry Woods
 Midwood 33-639:  The Girl Next Door [aka 'Everybody Welcome'] by Roy Peterson
 Midwood 33-640:  The Love Business by Cynthia Sydney
 Midwood 33-641:  Sure Thing by Max Collier
 Midwood 33-642:  The Pleasure Game by Brad Curtis
 Midwood ??-643:  
 Midwood 42-644:  The Defector by Paul Thomas
 Midwood 42-645:  Terror At Deepcliff by Dorethea Nile
 Midwood 42-646:  Renegade Guns by Robert J. Hogan
 Midwood 34-647:  One Long Weekend by Jim Lansing + Free For All by Jean Holbrook
 Midwood 34-648:  Nymph In Nylons by Amanda Moore + A Willing Worker by Leslie Roote
 Midwood 34-649:  One Too Many by John Balmer + Stay Until Morning by Cynthia Sydney
 Midwood 34-650:  Teenage Tornado by Joan Ellis + Apprentice Sinner by Connie Nelson
 Midwood 34-651:  Young And Restless by Terry Shaffer + Three Easy Lessons by Gus Stevens
 Midwood 33-652:  Paint Her Scarlet by Ursula Grant
 Midwood 33-653:  So Cold So Cruel by Norman A. King
 Midwood 33-654:  Prize Pupil by Amy Harris
 Midwood 32-655:  No Sense Of Shame by Daniel Brennan
 Midwood 33-656:  The Honeymoon Habit by Grant Corgan
 Midwood ??-657:  
 Midwood ??-658:  
 Midwood 43-659:  The Subject Of Harry Egypt by Daniel Broun
 Midwood 42-660:  Dynamo, Man Of High Camp by Unknown
 Midwood 34-661:  Campus Rebel by Joan Ellis + Quick Change by Mike Henry
 Midwood 34-662:  For Want Of Love by Terry Shaffer + Woman In Torment by Merry Woods
 Midwood 34-663:  Bundle Of Joy by Norman A. King + Girls On The Loose by Linda Michaels
 Midwood 34-664:  Get-Acquainted Party by Toni Stevens + The Higher The Price by Cynthia Sydney
 Midwood 34-665:  First Came Kathy by Max Collier
 Midwood 34-666:  No Price Too High by Russell Gage
 Midwood 33-667:  All In The Game by R.C. Gold
 Midwood 33-668:  Town Tease by Greg Hamilton
 Midwood 33-669:  So Eager To Please by Greg Hamilton
 Midwood 33-670:  A Female Female by Brad Curtis
 Midwood ??-671:  
 Midwood 42-672:  NoMan, The Invisible THUNDER Agent by Unknown
 Midwood 42-673:  
 Midwood 42-674:  Menthor, The T.H.U.N.D.E.R. Agent with The Super Helmet by Unknown
 Midwood 42-675:  
 Midwood 44-676:  The High Cost Of Living by Lewis J. Barker
 Midwood 34-677:  Doll Baby by Jack Townsend +Beach Party by Connie Nelson
 Midwood 34-678:  Summer Set by Gil Herbert + Available by Toni Stevens
 Midwood 34-679:  Girl In The Middle by John Burton Thompson
 Midwood 34-680:  I'll Be Good - Tomorrow [aka 'Horizontal Secretary'] by Amy Harris
 Midwood 34-681:  Already Taken by Joan Ellis + First Try by Dorothy Worden
 Midwood 33-682:  Campus Queen by Ursula Grant
 Midwood 33-683:  Test Of Love by Max Collier
 Midwood 33-684:  Reckless Wife by Connie Nelson
 Midwood 33-685:  Another Man's Wife by John Turner
 Midwood 33-686:  Old Enough by David Martell
 Midwood 42-687:  The Terrific Trio by Unknown
 Midwood ??-688:  
 Midwood 43-689:  The Courtesan by Kevin Mathews
 Midwood 43-690:  Bucks County Report by Irwin Wallach
 Midwood 42-691:  Sex And The Single Bat by Bat Babe & Rosie
 Midwood 43-692:  Fatal Mistake by Ovid Demaris
 Midwood ??-693:  
 Midwood 34-694:  Brandy Jones by John B. Thompson
 Midwood 34-695:  Campus Party by Joan Ellis + Tempting Teen by J.C, Comstock
 Midwood 34-696:  The Other Woman by Grant Corgan + The Quiet Type by Mike Henry
 Midwood 34-697:  Alone Too Long by Norman Anderson King + Rich Man's Wife by Cynthis Sydney
 Midwood 34-698:  Pleasant Company by Kimberly Kemp
 Midwood 33-699:  Night Spot by Jackson Harmon
 Midwood 33-700:  Why Play Games by Gus Stevens
 Midwood 33-701:  The Come On by Vin Fields
 Midwood 33-702:  One Of The Girls by Richard Mezatesta
 Midwood 33-703:  The Girl Downstairs by Rock Anthony
 Midwood 44-704:  One Of Our Bombers Is Missing by Dan Brennan
 Midwood ??-705:  
 Midwood 43-706:  Who, Me Fly? by Robert Scharff
 Midwood 43-707:  Sexual Gratification In Marriage by Jeffery Williams
 Midwood 34-708:  Kitty Breaks Loose by Jackson Harmon
 Midwood 34-709:  Co-Ed With Class by Dirk Malloy + Out For Kicks by Connie Nelson
 Midwood 34-710:  These Warm Nights by John Balmer + All The Trimmings by Steve Gregory
 Midwood 34-711:  The Sunday Lovers by Laura Duchamp + Marriage On The Side by Mike Henry
 Midwood 34-712:  Fiery Redhead by Joe Weiss
 Midwood 33-713:  Protect My Reputation by J.C. Comstock
 Midwood 33-714:  Mercedes by Carl Demarco
 Midwood 33-715:  Next Stop, Shame by Bart Matty
 Midwood 33-716:  Thrill Crazy by Brad Curtis
 Midwood 33-717:  A Taste Of Longing by aka 'Web Of Flesh'] by Mal Chance
 Midwood ??-718:  
 Midwood 42-719:  Outpost Of Eternity by Helen Arvonen
 Midwood 44-720:  Blood In The Sky by Dan Brennan
 Midwood 44-721:  Daughter, Oh My Daughter by Milfred Mesurac Jeffrey
 Midwood 34-722:  Teen-Age Hideaway by Joan Ellis + Running Wild by Tom Roberts
 Midwood 34-723:  Wives Play Too by Dirk Malloy + New Woman Around by Lucas J. Cassel
 Midwood 34-724:  After Hours by Chad Denby + Working Girl by Dana Pitman
 Midwood 34-725:  Test In Temptation by Laura Duchamp + Cool And Collected by Blake Randall
 Midwood 34-726:  Call Me Anytime by Mel Howard
 Midwood 34-727:  Everybody Welcome [aka 'The Girl Next Door'] by Dallas Mayo
 Midwood 33-728:  A Woman's Touch by Vin Fields
 Midwood 33-729:  Jody by Brad Curtis
 Midwood 33-730:  On Company Time by Daniel A. Morton
 Midwood 33-731:  The Fourth Woman by John B. Thompson
 Midwood 42-732:  Bitter Legacy by Ruth MacLeod
 Midwood 46-733:  The Oath by Riley Ryan
 Midwood 43-734:  The Psycho by Phillips Moore
 Midwood 43-735:  Operation - Sky Drop by Dan Brennan
 Midwood 34-736:  Break The Rules by Joan Ellis + Campus Affair by Mike Henry
 Midwood 34-737:  Draw The Blinds by Kimberly Kemp + Surprise, Surprise by Frank Graham
 Midwood 34-738:  A Passion For Wealth by Bruce Elliot + Too Rich To Care by Laura Duchamp
 Midwood 34-739:  Southern Belle by J.C. Comstock + Teen-Age Mischief by Terry Shaffer
 Midwood 34-740:  Suburban Fling by Jim Conroy + Sophisticated Party by Chad Denby
 Midwood 33-741:  The Sexually Maladjusted Female by A. Joseph Burstein
 Midwood 32-742:  Apartment Party by Gerald Kramer
 Midwood 33-743:  Teen Model by Lucas J. Cassell
 Midwood 33-744:  Pictures Of Marcia by Robert Bruce
 Midwood 33-745:  Warm Summer's Shame by Ken Blackwell
 Midwood 44-746:  If This Be Sexual Heresy by Albert Ellis
 Midwood 43-747:  Jacqueminot by Kathleen Rich
 Midwood 43-748:  Cathy's Way by Dan Brennan
 Midwood 43-749:  The Captive by John Turner
 Midwood 33-750:  Barbie by March Hastings
 Midwood 33-751:  Office Favorite by Dirk Malloy
 Midwood 33-752:  Earning Her Keep by J.C. Comstock
 Midwood 33-753:  Teen Temptress by R.C. Gold
 Midwood 34-754:  Hotel Hostess by Brad Curtis
 Midwood 34-755:  For Love Or Money by Chynthia Sydney + Hard To Handle by Dana Pitman
 Midwood 34-756:  That Blond Girl by Mike Henry + Campus Knockout by Frank Graham
 Midwood 34-757:  A Weakness For Men by Laura Duchamp + Dark Rooms, Dark Nights by Donna May
 Midwood 34-758:  One Hot Afternoon by John Hayes + AWOL Wife by Jackson Harmon
 Midwood 34-759:  Teen-Age Fling by Joan Ellis + Something New by Barbra Dean
 Midwood 42-760:  Fleur Macabre by Isabel Stewart Way
 Midwood ??-761:  
 Midwood ??-762:  
 Midwood 43-763:  Code Name - Rubble by Paul Thomas
 Midwood 46-764:  Guns Up by Ernest Haycox
 Midwood 34-765:  Tormented by John Burton Thompson
 Midwood 33-766:  Fever by Jim Conroy
 Midwood 33-767:  Camera Action by Dirk Malloy
 Midwood 33-768:  Suzanne by Carl Demarco
 Midwood 33-769:  Professional Favors by Jackson Harmon
 Midwood 34-770:  Swinging Secretary by Mike Henry + Office Party by Connie Nelson
 Midwood 34-771:  Part-Time Wife by Art Rawley + Play For Keeps by Tom Roberts
 Midwood 34-772:  The Added Attraction by Jack Stanton + Caught In The Act by Eric Hamland
 Midwood 34-773:  High School Rebel by Joan Ellis + Coolest Girl by Gerald Kramer
 Midwood 34-774:  Head Over Heels by Frank Graham + Teen With Talent by J.C. Comstock
 Midwood 44-775:  The Bird's Nest by Shirley Jackson
 Midwood 43-776:  The Mind Cage by A.E. Van Vogt
 Midwood 46-777:  Wipe Out The Brierlys [aka 'Brand Fires On The Ridge!'] by Ernest Haycox
 Midwood 42-778:  Murder Las Vegas Style by W.T. Ballard
 Midwood 43-779:  A Rage Within by March Hastings
 Midwood 33-780:  This Is Elaine by Jason Hytes
 Midwood 34-781:  Facination by Laura Deschamp + Topless by Mark Reading
 Midwood 34-782:  Seductress by John Balmer + Sudden Affair by Lawrence Black
 Midwood 34-783:  Appartment To Share by Joan Ellis + Change Of Pace by Eric Hamland
 Midwood 34-784:  French Leave by Norman Anderson King + Night Games by Dana Pitman
 Midwood 33-785:  The Nylon Trap by Lin Evans
 Midwood 33-786:  Night School by Jeremy August
 Midwood 33-787:  Secrets Of Success by Lucas J. Cassel
 Midwood 33-788:  Soft Shoulders by Paul V. Russo
 Midwood 33-789:  Career Girl by Joe Weiss
 Midwood ??-790:  
 Midwood 46-791:  Guns Of Fury by Ernest Hacox
 Midwood 42-792:  Why Are They Watching Us? by Alex Louis Erskine
 Midwood 43-793:  A Time Of Torment by Jason Hytes
 Midwood 32-794:  Two For The Road by Gerald Kramer
 Midwood 32-795:  A Taste Of Shame by Jackson Harmon
 Midwood 32-796:  Adult Education by Vin Fields
 Midwood 33-797:  Two Women by Kimberly Kemp
 Midwood 33-798:  Enraptured by March Hastings
 Midwood 34-799:  Her First Mistake by Joan Ellis
 Midwood 34-800:  Bad Penny by Dirk Malloy + Naughty Teen by Tom Roberts
 Midwood 34-801:  Company Girl by Chad Denby + Take Me Home by Donna May
 Midwood 34-802:  A Big Girl Now by Laura Duchamp + Up For Sale by John Jameson
 Midwood 34-803:  Plaything by Jim Conroy + Fondly by Stuart Rand
 Midwood 43-804:  The Lady From L.U.S.T. #1 [aka 'Lust, Be A Lady Tonight'] by Rod Gray
 Midwood 32-805:  Ginny by Gil Hebert
 Midwood 32-806:  Pleasure Play by Brad Curtis
 Midwood 32-807:  The Janitor's Daughter by Amy Harris
 Midwood 33-808:  Woman On A String by Carl Demarco
 Midwood 33-809:  Three Can Play by Robert Wayne
 Midwood 34-810:  Perfumed And Powered by Joe Weiss
 Midwood 34-811:  Keep Me by Dana Pitman + Corrupt by Tammy James
 Midwood ??-812:  
 Midwood 34-813:  College Girl by Stephen Kane + Daring Coed by Frank Graham
 Midwood 34-814:  Always Say Yes by Monty Brian + A Sure Thing by Vin Fields
 Midwood 43-815:  One-Way Ticket by Jason Hytes
 Midwood ??-816:  
 Midwood 43-817:  They Knew Too Much by Gray Barker
 Midwood ??-818:  
 Midwood 43-819:  Mission Incredible by Lawrence Cortesi
 Midwood ??-820:  
 Midwood ??-821:  
 Midwood 42-822:  Fight Or Die by Todhunter Ballard
 Midwood 43-823:  The Two Mrs. Carrolls by Helen Arvonen
 Midwood 42-824:  The Spy Who Came Home To Die by Jerry Well
 Midwood 32-825:  Under The Skin by Laura Duchamp
 Midwood 32-826:  Everything Nice by Joan Ellis
 Midwood 33-827:  The Sexually Neurotic Male by A. Joseph Bursteln
 Midwood 32-828:  One By One by Gus Stevens
 Midwood 33-829:  Baby Sister by Greg Hamilton
 Midwood 34-830:  Never Enough by Jason Hytes
 Midwood 34-831:  Blanket Party by Dirk Malloy + Sultry Summer by Lon Albert
 Midwood 34-832:  Bitter Choice by John Travis + Shadow Love by Nick Masters
 Midwood 34-833:  On The Rebound by Ursula Grant + Executive Wife by Cynthia Sydney
 Midwood 34-834:  Peeping Tom by Virginia West + Temptation by Tammy Jones
 Midwood ??-835:  
 Midwood 32-836:  Let's Play House by Joan Ellis
 Midwood 32-837:  The Bisexual Woman by David Lynne
 Midwood 32-838:  Teach Me by Amanda Moore
 Midwood 32-839:  If A Man Answers by Grant Corgan
 Midwood 34-840:  Too Much Woman by Jason Hytes
 Midwood 34-841:  The Switch Set by Laura Duchamp + Delicate Tramp by Lawrence Black
 Midwood 34-842:  Just For Kicks by Jim Conroy + Anxious To Please by Terry Shaffer
 Midwood 34-843:  Out For Thrills by Mark Reading + The Perfumed Trap by Dean Merrick
 Midwood 34-844:  Penthouse Tramp by Mason Lein + Off Limits by C.F. Denby
 Midwood 44-845:  The Romance Of Violette by Unknown
 Midwood ??-846:  
 Midwood ??-847:  
 Midwood ??-848:  
 Midwood 43-849:  Grotesque Sex Crimes by William Ruben
 Midwood 33-850:  Stag Starlet by Paul V. Russo
 Midwood 33-851:  Sexual Behavior Of The American Housewife by W.D. Sprague
 Midwood 33-852:  Born To Be Bad [aka 'Puta'] by Sheldon Lord
 Midwood 33-853:  Sin School by Don Holliday
 Midwood 33-854:  21 Gay Street by Sheldon Lord
 Midwood 33-855:  All My Lovers by Alan Marshall
 Midwood 33-856:  The Blonde by Peggy Swenson
 Midwood 33-857:  69 Barrow Street by Sheldon Lord
 Midwood 34-858:  No Men Wanted by Dallas Mayo + Switcher by Allan Horn
 Midwood ??-859:  
 Midwood 43-860:  The Lady From L.U.S.T. #2 Lay Me Odds by Rob Gray
 Midwood 45-861:  The Couch by D. Royal
 Midwood 43-862:  Mistress Of The Shadows by Ruth MacLeod
 Midwood ??-863:  
 Midwood ??-864:  
 Midwood ??-865:  
 Midwood 32-866:  Adultery In Suburbia by Robert Brooks
 Midwood 32-867:  Sin Now, Pay Later by Allan Horn
 Midwood 33-868:  One At A Time by Lou Craig
 Midwood 34-869:  Love Like A Shadow by Kimberly Kemp
 Midwood 33-870:  Anybody's Girl by March Hastings
 Midwood 34-871:  The Loving Couples by Jim Conroy
 Midwood 34-872:  Any Way You Want It by Laura Duchamp + Room At The Bottom by Edward Moore
 Midwood 34-873:  Action Girl by Dallas Mayo + Payment On Demand by Lucas J. Cassell
 Midwood 34-874:  Go-Go Girl by Bruce Dale + A Special Talent by Eric Hamland
 Midwood 34-875:  Almost A Virgin by Sloan Brittain + Pick-Up by Paul V. Russo
 Midwood 45-876:  Fleshpots Of Antiquity by Henry Frichet
 Midwood 43-877:  Sex Is Big Business by John Austin
 Midwood 43-878:  The President's Right Hand by Dan Brennan
 Midwood 43-879:  Rita by Jason Hytes
 Midwood 32-880:  Sex And The Divorcee by David Lynne
 Midwood 33-881:  Name Your Pleasure by Brad Curtis
 Midwood 33-882:  The Seduction Game by Vin Fields
 Midwood 33-883:  Always Available by Jim Conroy
 Midwood 33-884:  Man Hungry by Alan Marshall
 Midwood 33-885:  A Strange Kind Of Love by Sheldon Lord
 Midwood 34-886:  Diagnosis Murder by S.R. Fontaine + Private Nurse by Lon Albert
 Midwood 34-887:  No Time For Virgins by John Balmer + For Stags Only by Robert Bruce
 Midwood 34-888:  Wet, Wild And Wonderful by Lucas J. Cassell + Anything For Kicks by Gene Norton
 Midwood 34-889:  Warm Bodies by Joan Ellis + Gang Up by Tammy James
 Midwood ??-890:  
 Midwood 43-891:  The Summer Ghosts by Alexis Lykiard
 Midwood 43-892:  Are The Invaders Coming? by Steven Tyler
 Midwood ??-893:  
 Midwood ??-894:  
 Midwood 34-895:  Runaway Girls by Fred Shannon
 Midwood 34-896:  Sleep-In Girl by Dick Kamp
 Midwood ??-897:  
 Midwood 34-898:  The Sex Tests by Amanda Moore
 Midwood 34-899:  Stag Show by Dallas Mayo
 Midwood 34-900:  Insatiable by Sloan Brittain
 Midwood 34-901:  Take Me by Mark Reading + What Price Incest by Don Haring
 Midwood 34-902:  Kept by Laura Duchamp + Topless And Tempting by Max Nortic
 Midwood 34-903:  Sin Sorority by Edward McCallin + The Waitress [aka 'Private Party'] by Chris Harrison
 Midwood 34-904:  Daisy Chain by Greg Hamilton + Wild For Kicks by Terry Cash
 Midwood ??-905:  
 Midwood 43-906:  The Human Zero by Various Authors
 Midwood ??-907:  
 Midwood ??-908:  
 Midwood 34-909:  Connie by Loren Beauchamp
 Midwood 45-910:  Autobiography Of A Louse by Unknown
 Midwood 44-911:  Svetlana Alllluyeva: Flight To Freedom by James Hudson
 Midwood 43-912:  The Lady From L.U.S.T. #3 The 69 Pleasures by Rob Gray
 Midwood 34-913:  Double Your Pleasure by Gus Stevens
 Midwood 34-914:  Nympho by Max Collier
 Midwood 34-915:  Lover Boy by Max Nortic
 Midwood 34-916:  Gigolo by Chris Harrison
 Midwood 34-917:  Perfume And Pain by Kimberly Kemp
 Midwood 34-918:  Any Man Will Do by Greg Hamilton
 Midwood 35-919:  Crazy For Love by Dirk Malloy + One Hot Night by Cory Mallord
 Midwood 35-920:  Twilight Sex by March Hastings + Unnatural by Luther Lee
 Midwood 35-921:  Reluctant Virgin by Lucas J. Cassel + Very Private Secretary by Gil Herbert
 Midwood 35-922:  Teen Swinger by Terry Cash + Girls Camp by Edward McCallin
 Midwood 45-923:  The Hostage by D. Royal
 Midwood ??-924:  
 Midwood ??-925:  
 Midwood 45-926:  The Sexual History Of France by Henry L. Marchand
 Midwood 34-927:  Pagan by Paul V. Russo
 Midwood 34-928:  Baby Doll by Edward McCallin
 Midwood 34-929:  The Sex Zone by Sloan Brittain
 Midwood 34-930:  Anything Goes by Peter McCurtin
 Midwood 45-931:  The Turkish Art Of Love by Pinhas Ben-Nahum
 Midwood 42-932:  Dead Reckoning by Kenneth Fowler
 Midwood 43-933:  Yesterday's Virgin by Jason Hytes
 Midwood 35-934:  The Sex Between by Jason Hytes + When Ladies Love by Jason Hytes
 Midwood 34-935:  The Farmer's Wife by Chris Harrison
 Midwood 34-936:  Pushover by Max Nortic
 Midwood 34-937:  Sex In The Shadows by Greg Hamilton
 Midwood 34-938:  Easy by Peggy Swanson
 Midwood 34-939:  Voyeur by Jim Conroy
 Midwood 34-940:  Her First Time by Joan Ellis
 Midwood 35-941:  For Love Or Money by Gus Stevens + Office Tease by Vin Fields
 Midwood 34-942:  Group Sex by Max Collier
 Midwood 34-943:  I, Lesbian by M.L. Johnson
 Midwood 43-944:  The Lady From L.U.S.T. #4 5 Beds To Mecca by Rod Gray
 Midwood 42-945:  Day Of The Gun by William Cox
 Midwood 43-946:  Sex Before Six by Jason Hytes
 Midwood 42-947:  The Doomsday Planet by Harl Vincent
 Midwood 44-948:  Jacqueline, Daughter Of Marquis de Sade by Jean-Paul Denard
 Midwood 44-949:  Memoirs Of A Harem Girl by Aisha
 Midwood 34-950:  No Holds Barred by Luther Lee
 Midwood 34-951:  Sex Club by John Borden
 Midwood 35-952:  Almost Like Rape by Lucas J. Cassel + One Hot Weekend by J.C. Comstock
 Midwood 35-953:  Runaway Teen by Amy Harris + The Marriage Wrecker by Terry Shaffer
 Midwood 34-954:  Meet Me At The Motel by Gus Stevens
 Midwood 34-955:  The Trip by Palmer Lane
 Midwood 34-956:  Fraternity Pet by Edward McCallin
 Midwood 43-957:  The Not-Men by Jack Williamson
 Midwood 42-958:  The Day The Killers Came by John S. Daniels
 Midwood 43-959:  That Moment Of Passion by Richard Lortz
 Midwood 43-960:  The Cave Of Chinese Skeltons by Jack Seward
 Midwood 34-961:  School Tease by Robert Hadley
 Midwood 34-962:  Ladder Of Flesh by Sloan Brittain
 Midwood 34-963:  The Unashamed by March Hastings
 Midwood 34-964:  The Outrage by Greg Hamilton
 Midwood 34-965:  Sex Ranch by Chris Harrison
 Midwood 35-966:  The Sex Game by Arjay Scott + Young And Hot by Ary Phillips
 Midwood ??-967:  
 Midwood 42-968:  Lassiter by Jack Slade
 Midwood ??-969:  
 Midwood 43-970:  Dracula's Curse by Bram Stoker
 Midwood ??-971:  
 Midwood ??-972:  
 Midwood 44-973:  Her Secret Life by Xman Ranier
 Midwood 34-974:  A Choice Of Sexes by Carol Caine
 Midwood 34-975:  Miss Round Heels by Gerald Kramer
 Midwood 34-976:  Odd Girl On Campus by Joan Ellis
 Midwood 34-977:  Jailbait by Edward McCallin
 Midwood 34-978:  Again And Again by March Hastings
 Midwood 34-979:  Pretty Puppet by Dallas Mayo
 Midwood 34-980:  To Sex, With Love by Lucas J. Cassel
 Midwood 34-981:  Tony's Room by Jay Greene
 Midwood 35-982:  Sin Time by Terry Shaffer + Office Pet by Allan Horn
 Midwood 35-983:  Playgirl by Lou Craig + Just Ask by Mel Johnson
 Midwood ??-984:  
 Midwood 45-985:  The Asbestos Diary by Casimir Dukahz
 Midwood 43-986:  The Time Curve by Various Authors
 Midwood 43-987:  Intimate Strangers by Harry Robbins
 Midwood 44-988:  Spirit World by Houdini + Psychic Revelations by Dunninger
 Midwood 44-989:  The Lady From L.U.S.T. #5 The Hot Mahatma by Rod Gray
 Midwood 34-990:  Sex On Arrival by Alan Marshall
 Midwood 34-991:  Thank Me Later by Carol Caine
 Midwood 34-992:  Married Tramp by Max Nortic
 Midwood ??-993:  
 Midwood 34-994:  Instant Sex by Mel Johnson
 Midwood 34-995:  Three by Dallas Mayo
 Midwood 34-996:  Party Time by Kimberly Kemp
 Midwood ??-997:  
 Midwood 35-998:  Try Me by Dirk Makkoy + Come And Get It by Bertrand Lord
 Midwood 35-999:  Hot Hands by Don Haring + Wild Teen by Vin Fields
 Midwood 42-100:  The Professional by Joseph Chadwick
 Midwood 42-101:  Lassiter #2 - Bandido by Jack Slade
 Midwood 34-102:  Weekend Of Sex by Max Collier
 Midwood 34-103:  Wild Angel by Edward McCallin
 Midwood 34-104:  The Odd Man by Leon Sorell
 Midwood 34-105:  The Baby Sitter by Vin Fields
 Midwood 34-106:  Swinging Secretary by Alan Marshall
 Midwood 34-107:  A Woman Like Me by Carol Caine
 1968 Midwood 34-108:  Pleasure Machine by Sheldon Lord
 Midwood 34-109:  Reluctant Nympho by Joan Ellis
 Midwood 35-110:  Beach Stud by Terry Cash + Sex In The Sun by Jack Holt
 Midwood 35-111:  Teen Tease by Bertrand Lord + Never Too Young by Dana Pitman
 Midwood 43-112:  Why Did They Kill Charley? by Carter Travis Young
 Midwood 44-113:  The Dillinger Story by Ovid Demaris
 Midwood 43-114:  Strangers In The Night by Harry Robbins
 Midwood 44-115:  Psychogeist by L.P. Davies
 Midwood 34-116:  Eighteen And Legal by Marck Reading
 Midwood 34-117:  Obsessed by Max Nortic
 Midwood 34-118:  Fun Girl by Grant Corgan
 Midwood 34-119:  The Boss's Couch by Jim Conroy
 Midwood 34-120:  Teen Hippie by Peggy Swenson
 Midwood 34-121:  World Of Women by Carol Caine
 Midwood 34-122:  Taboo by Sloan Brittain
 Midwood 35-123:  Bedside Manners by Dirk Malloy + Student Nurse by Shawana Dennis
 Midwood ??-124:  
 Midwood 37-125:  Hot Co-ed by Joan Ellis + Office Pushover by Jason Hytes + Gay Interlude by Sloan Brittain
 Midwood 44-126:  The Lady From L.U.S.T. #6 To Russia With L.U.S.T. by Rod Gray
 Midwood 43-127:  This Girl by Jason Hytes
 Midwood ??-128:  
 Midwood ??-129:  
 Midwood 44-130:  The Magnificent Bastards Of Vietnam by Lawrence Cortesi
 Midwood 35-131:  Sorority Sinners by Brian North + Under The Covers by Greg Hamilton
 Midwood 35-132:  Teach Me Tonight by Chales Castleman + Put Out Or Else by Albert Powell
 Midwood 35-133:  Peep Show by Sloan Brittain + Thrill Me by Don Harvey
 Midwood 35-134:  Campus Nympho by Carol Caine + Ex-Virgin by Stephanie Chrisman
 Midwood ??-135:  
 Midwood 42-136:  Lassiter #3 The Man From Yuma by W.T. Ballard
 Midwood 44-137:  Legs Diamond by Sam Curzon
 Midwood ??-138:  
 Midwood 35-139:  Sex Slave by Paul V. Russo + Keyhole Thrills by Lucas J. Cassel
 Midwood 37-140:  Ermine by Kimberly Kemp + Gay Harem by Greg Hamilton + Campus Roundheels by Robert Hadley
 Midwood 37-141:  Teen-Age Sex Party by Joan Ellis + Office Playmate by Jill Hammond + Experiment In Adultery by March Hastings
 Midwood 35-142:  Sorority Scandal by Dallas Mayo + The Secret Flesh by Carol Caine
 Midwood 35-143:  Teen-Age Rebel by Dana Pitman + Red Hot Virgin by Brian North
 Midwood 35-144:  High School Thrill Club by Edward McCallin + Virgin Territory by Frank Sawyer
 Midwood ??-145:  
 Midwood 35-146:  I Want A Man by John Balmer + I Can't Wait by Leon Sorell
 Midwood 35-147:  Candy by Sheldon Lord
 Midwood 34-148:  Behind These Walls by Jay Greene
 Midwood 35-149:  Pretty Boy by Jay Greene
 Midwood 35-150:  Prescription For Sex by Vin Fields + Night Nurse by Max Nortic
 Midwood 35-151:  Teacher's Pet by Edward McCallin + Private Lessons by Frank Sawyer
 Midwood 35-152:  Lipstick And Leather by Chris Harrison + Wicked Woman by Arnold Evans
 Midwood 37-153:  Two Of A Kind by Kimberly Kemp + Virgin Wanted by Max Nortic + Invitation To Rape by Joan Ellis
 Midwood 35-154:  Do It Again by Greg Hamilton + The Sex Seekers by Robert Hadley
 Midwood ??-155:  
 Midwood 35-156:  Born A Tramp by Terry Cash + Seduce Me by Jackson Harmon
 Midwood ??-157:  
 Midwood ??-158:  
 Midwood 43-159:  The Eurasian Virgins by Jack Seward
 Midwood 44-160:  The Lady From L.U.S.T. #7 Kiss My Assassin by Rod Gray
 Midwood ??-161:  
 Midwood 43-162:  The Shaming Of Broken Horn by Bill Gulick
 Midwood 34-163:  Blonde On A Blanket by Edward McCallin
 Midwood 35-164:  The Cadets by Jay Greene
 Midwood 35-165:  She Couldn't Stop by Joan Ellis + Attacked! by Erica Dewitt
 Midwood 42-166:  Proudly They Die by Lewis B. Patten
 Midwood ??-167:  
 Midwood 45-168:  Rough Trade by Jay Greene
 Midwood 42-169:  Lassiter #4 The Man From Cheyenne by Jack Slade
 Midwood ??-170:  
 Midwood 44-171:  The Lady From L.U.S.T. #8 South Of The Bordello by Rod Gray
 Midwood ??-172:  
 Midwood 35-173:  Little Girl by Terry Shaffer + Born For Passion by Walter Davidson
 Midwood 35-174:  Forbidden Love by Paul V. Russo + Strange Desires by Gerald Kramer
 Midwood 35-175:  Wild Waitress by Jack Holt + Thrill Hungry by Bertrand Lord
 Midwood 35-176:  Odd Couple by Peggy Swenson + Teen Butch by Carol Caine
 Midwood 34-177:  Stud by Sheldon Lord
 Midwood 34-178:  Sex Unlimited by Sloan Brittain
 Midwood ??-179:  
 Midwood ??-180:  
 Midwood ??-181:  
 Midwood 45-182:  The Boys And Bringham Dee by March Hastings
 Midwood 34-183:  Free Sample [aka 'Wayward Widow'] by Loren Beauchamp
 Midwood 44-184:  The Blunderers by James A. Hudson
 Midwood 42-185:  Galaxy 666 by Pel Torro
 Midwood ??-186:  
 Midwood ??-187:  
 Midwood 35-188:  Bedtime Lessons by Lee Harman + Anxious To Please by Lee Harman
 Midwood 35-189:  The Sin Generation by Joan Ellis + Teen In Trouble by Greg Hamilton
 Midwood 37-190:  Gay Girls by Carol Caine + Switch-Hitter by March Hastings + Unnatural Love by Greg Hamilton
 Midwood 37-191:  Sex Incorporated by Sloan Brittain + Swinging Stewardess by Dirk Malloy + Married Nympho by Grant Corgan
 Midwood 35-192:  Bitter Wine by Jay Greene
 Midwood 34-193:  The Peeper by Sheldon Lord
 Midwood 35-194:  Strange by Dallas Mayo + Twilight Women by Lee Harmon
 Midwood 35-195:  Running Wild by Peggy Swenson + Love-In by Greg Hamilton
 Midwood 35-196:  The Other Way by Robert Hadley + Strange Fascination by Greg Hamilton
 Midwood 35-197:  College Tease by Joan Ellis + Town Tramp by Walter Davidson
 Midwood 37-198:  Campus Swinger by Dirk Malloy + Virgins Are Best by Jack Holt
 Midwood 37-199:  Young And Eager by Jim Conroy + Quickie by Gene Evans + Nympho Nurse by Mel Johnson
 Midwood 35-200:  Flesh by Max Collier + The Sadist by Mel Johnston
 Midwood ??-201:  
 Midwood ??-202:  
 Midwood ??-203:  
 Midwood 35-204:  Nino by Jay Greene
 Midwood 34-205:  Strange Triangle by Chris Harrison
 Midwood 37-206:  Diary Of A Parisian Chambermaid by Claudine Dumas
 Midwood 37-207:  My Wicked Pleasures by Molly X
 Midwood 42-208:  Guns Of Fury by Ernest Haycox
 Midwood 43-209:  The Chinese Pleasure Girl by Jack Seward
 Midwood 45-210:  The Harem Of Ain Sebaa by Ary Caldwell Phillip
 Midwood 45-211:  The Strasburg Collection by Ellen McGinnis
 Midwood 45-212:  The Lady From L.U.S.T. #9 The Poisoned Pussy [aka 'Sock It to Me'] by Rod Gray
 Midwood 35-213:  Single Swingers by Joan Ellis + Torrid by Dan Harvey
 Midwood 35-214:  Sex Service by Peter McCurtin + Games by Greg Hamilton
 Midwood 35-215:  Black Satin by Max Nortic + White Thighs by Jim Conroy
 Midwood 35-216:  High School Nympho by John Balmer + Cradle Robber by Gus Stevens
 Midwood 37-217:  Mini-Tramp by Joan Ellis + In Heat by Lee Harmon + Jet Set Sex by Robert Hadley
 Midwood 37-218:  Just Whistle by Greg Hamilton + Wide Open by Dirk Malloy + Stripped by Terry Shaffer
 Midwood 43-219:  Lassiter #5 A Hell Of A Way To Die by Jack Slade
 Midwood 45-220:  Seductions by John London
 Midwood ??-221:  
 Midwood ??-222:  
 Midwood 34-223:  Sea Of Thighs by Sloan Britain
 Midwood 37-224:  Come One, Come All by Greg Hamilton + Three-Way Scene by Joan Ellis + Change Partners by Gerald Kramer
 Midwood 35-225:  Bunk Buddies by Sky James
 Midwood 35-226:  Depraved by Max Nortic + A.C.-D.C. by Lee Harmon
 Midwood 35-227:  Do It To Me by Mel Johnson + Hot Blonde by Jim Conroy
 Midwood 35-228:  On The Make by Jack Holt + Layaway Plan by Gene Evans
 Midwood 35-229:  The Sweetest Vice by Greg Hamilton + Gently My Love by Greg Hamilton
 Midwood 35-230:  A Girl A Night by Mark Reading + Sex And Me by Lee Harmon
 Midwood 37-231:  Breaking Loose by Julie Ellis + Once a Tramp by Walter Davidson + Sisters In Sin by Leon Sorell
 Midwood ??-232:  
 Midwood 34-233:  Pagan Summer by Dallas Mayo
 Midwood 34-234:  The Whispered Love by Dallas Mayo
 Midwood ??-235:  
 Midwood 35-236:  Why Be A Virgin by Joan Ellis + Young And Ready by Terry Shaffer
 Midwood 35-237:  Girl On Fire by Max Nortic + Teach Me How by Robert Hadley
 Midwood 35-238:  End Of Innocence by Mark Reading + Reckless Virgin by Loraine Sutton
 Midwood 35-239:  Strange Worlds by Greg Hamilton + Gay Roommates by Lee Harmon
 Midwood ??-240:  School For Sin by Max Nortic + Let Me Watch by Terry Cash
 Midwood 35-241:  High School Stud by Robert Hadley + Campus Doll by Mel Jonson
 Midwood 37-242:  Motel by Max Nortic
 Midwood 37-243:  Lulie; Recollections Of A Slave Girl by Unknown
 Midwood 35-244:  Line-Up by Lin Evans
 Midwood 37-245:  Hot Hostess by Joan Ellis + Once Is Never Enough by Gus Stevens + Time On Her Hands by Gene Evans
 Midwood 43-246:  Bloch And Bradbury by Robert Bloch & Ray Bradbury
 Midwood 43-247:  The Last Astronaut by Pel Torro
 Midwood 43-248:  Escape From Yuma by Frank Castle
 Midwood ??-249:  
 Midwood 43-250:  Lassiter #6 High Lonesome by Jack Slade
 Midwood 43-251:  The Three Faces Of Time by Frank Belknap Long
 Midwood 34-252:  Nymph by Peggy Swensen
 Midwood 35-253:  Girl Games by Veronica King + Twisted by Dorothy Wilde
 Midwood 37-254:  The Honey Trap by Jon Wolfe
 Midwood 35-255:  
 Midwood 37-256:  Let's Do It by Clay Grant + High Score Girl by Erica DeWitt + Stolen Goods by Lin Evans
 Midwood 37-257:  
 Midwood 34-258:  Soft And Easy by Dallas Mayo
 Midwood ??-259:  
 Midwood ??-260:  
 Midwood ??-261:  
 Midwood 37-262:  Flesh Games - Memoirs Of A Scroundrel by Unknown
 Midwood ??-263:  
 Midwood 43-264:  Lassiter #7 Sidewinder by Frank Castle
 Midwood ??-265:  
 Midwood 44-266:  Black Harvest by William S. Tyrone
 Midwood 43-267:  Assignment Find Cherry by Jack Seward
 Midwood 43-268:  Beyond The Barrier Of Space by Pel Torro
 Midwood 34-269:  Play With Me by Kimberly Kemp
 Midwood ??-270:  
 Midwood 35-271:  Split-Shift Sex by Peggy Aldrich + Crazy For It by Dick Scott
 Midwood 37-272:  Reckless Wife by Connie Nelson + Catch Me-Keep Me by John Balmer + Soiled by Jim Conroy
 Midwood 37-273:  Virgin Offering by James Miller
 Midwood 37-274:  Soul Orgy by Aldo Lucchesi
 Midwood 43-275:  Star Giant by Dorothy Skinkle
 Midwood 45-276:  The Lady From L.U.S.T. #10 The Big Snatch by Rod Gray
 Midwood 34-277:  Secret Cravings [aka 'The Last Resort'] by Kimberly Kemp
 Midwood 35-278:  Shack-Up by Frank Reeves + Quick To Learn by Terry Shaffer
 Midwood 37-279:  Night After Night by Robert Hadley + Cindy by Harry McLane + Games Virgins Play by Tracy Cook
 Midwood ??-280:  
 Midwood 37-281:  The Young Stallions by Beaverly Beaumont
 Midwood 37-282:  Devil In The Flesh by Gloria Steinway
 Midwood 37-283:  The Pleasure Thing by Mike Carroll
 Midwood 43-284:  Feud Valley by Walt Coburn
 Midwood ??-285:  
 Midwood 37-286:  Possessed by Max Nortic
 Midwood 37-287:  The Hostage by D. Royal
 Midwood ??-288:  
 Midwood 35-289:  Gang Girl by Walter Davidson + Time For One More by Peggy Swenson
 Midwood 34-290:  Teen On Call by Greg Hamilton
 Midwood ??-291:  
 Midwood 37-292:  Initiation by Philip Halden + Casino Butch by Kimberly Kemp
 Midwood 37-293:  Victims by Bradley Hall
 Midwood 37-294:  The Couch by D. Royal
 Midwood 37-295:  Spasm by Daryl McCauley
 Midwood 37-296:  The Climax by Malcolm Corris
 Midwood 38-297:  Flesh Festival by Aldo Lucchesi
 Midwood 38-298:  Babychick by Odda De Lazzo
 Midwood 45-299:  The Lady From L.U.S.T. #11 Lady In Heat by Rod Gray
 Midwood ??-300:  
 Midwood ??-301:  
 Midwood 43-302:  Ramrod by Merle Clark
 Midwood 43-303:  Hell Branded by Chuck Mason
 Midwood 43-304:  The Unending Night by George H. Smith
 Midwood 37-305:  Stud Power by Veronica King
 Midwood 37-306:  Sex Fire by Cynthia
 Midwood 37-307:  Silky by Dallas Mayo
 Midwood 37-308:  Jacqueline, Daughter Of The Marquis De Sade by Jean Paul Denard
 Midwood ??-309:  
 Midwood ??-310:  
 Midwood 37-311:  I Am The Lie by Susanna Scherr
 Midwood 37-312:  Brandenburg Heights by John Seberg
 Midwood 37-313:  Starlet by Dick Scott
 Midwood 37-314:  Slow Burn by Marcus Pendanter
 Midwood ??-315:  
 Midwood 38-316:  The Inheritors by Odda Delazzo
 Midwood 37-317:  Lady Finger by Malcolm Corris
 Midwood 37-318:  Screwed Up by Doral Scott
 Midwood 38-319:  Andromedia Lain by Mitchell Criterion
 Midwood 37-320:  The Moth And The Flame by Anonymous
 Midwood 43-321:  Tower At The Edge Of Time by Lin Carter
 Midwood 43-322:  The Trouble Grabber by Frank C. Robertson
 Midwood ??-323:  
 Midwood ??-324:  
 Midwood ??-325:  
 Midwood ??-326:  
 Midwood ??-327:  
 Midwood 38-328:  Sex Magus by Aldo Lucchesi
 Midwood 37-329:  One Man's Meat by James Miller + Pajama Pickup by Vin Fields
 Midwood ??-330:  
 Midwood 38-331:  Swapped by Lin Evans + Love Clinic by Jack Holt
 Midwood 37-332:  The Sybarites by Odda DeLazzo
 Midwood 37-333:  Lay The Devil by Adrian Cross
 Midwood ??-334:  
 Midwood 38-335:  An Intimate Life by Robert Hadley + Coed In Distress by Margaret Penn
 Midwood 37-336:  The Flake by Odda DeLazzo
 Midwood 38-337:  Total Awareness by Max Nortic
 Midwood 37-338:  Sex-In by Ignatius Stone
 Midwood 37-339:  The Sex Underground by Kermit Klitch

MIDWOOD COLLECTOR'S CLASSICS SERIES 
 
 Midwood 125-1:  
 Midwood 125-2:  
 Midwood 125-3:  The Jock by Douglas Kennedy + The Sins In Her Eyes by Mary Singleton
 Midwood 125-4:  Oral Orbit by Norman Jackson
 Midwood 125-5:  Love Commune by Robert Hadley
 Midwood 125-6:  The 900 Ways by James Hillman
 Midwood 125-7:  Muscle by Aldo Lucchesi
 Midwood 125-8:  Where The Bee Sucks by Manny Gihan
 Midwood 125-9:  Sadie Maize by Gay Whipple
 Midwood 125-10:  The Big Ball by Marcus Pendanter
 Midwood 125-11:  How They Do It In Rio by J.C. Thomas
 Midwood 125-12:  Baby Jade by Cynthia
 Midwood 125-13:  The Bedmobile by Honey Potimkin
 Midwood 125-14:  Games Grownups Play by Mitchell Criterion
 Midwood 125-15:  Sugar And Spice And Everything Twice by Kermitt Klitch
 Midwood 125-16:  The Marriage Raper by Elizabeth West
 Midwood 125-17:  Down On Me by Alyss Poplin
 Midwood 125-18:  Take A Lesbian To Lunch by Ann Aldrich
 Midwood 125-19:  Juicy Lucy by Mason Southern
 Midwood 125-20:  The Perfect Oh by Samantha Rider
 Midwood 125-21:  The Sensualists by Odda DeLazzo
 Midwood 125-22:  Sex Incorporated by Serena Wilson
 Midwood 125-23:  Lesbian Interlude by Dallas Mayo
 Midwood 125-24:  Felicia by Tod Parker
 Midwood 125-25:  Moonbabies by Eric Jay
 Midwood 125-26:  A Long Time Coming by Jon Thomas
 Midwood 125-27:  Pandora Descending by Linda DuBreuil
 Midwood 125-28:  Masques Of Eros by John Holt
 Midwood 125-29:  A Very Pretty Story by Cynthia
 Midwood 125-30:  Nightrider by Charles DeGallamania
 Midwood 125-31:  The Bride In The Bed With The Mirrors 'Round Her Head by Veronica King
 Midwood 125-32:  Call Me Calamity by John Cleve
 Midwood 125-33:  Neversleep by Francine Janssen
 Midwood 125-34:  Oh! The Trailer Park Parties! by Bruce Elliot
 Midwood 125-35:  Synthetic Madonna by Lin Evans
 Midwood 125-36:  The Girl Who Did It by Robert Davis
 Midwood 125-37:  The Woman Zapper by Gus Stevens
 Midwood 125-38:  I Am Curious by Montgomery Popoff
 Midwood 125-39:  Different Strokes For Different Folks by Kermit Klitch
 Midwood 125-40:  Naked Came The Skater by J.J. Madison
 Midwood 125-41:  Astrosex by George Shaw
 Midwood 125-42:  Freeze by Manfred Asher
 Midwood 125-43:  A Pocket Full by Imo Yashima
 Midwood 125-44:  Warm, Very Warm by Liam Mcdonald Downs
 Midwood 125-45:  Guts by J. Pinetree
 Midwood 125-46:  The Four-Letter Word by Mitchell Criterion
 Midwood 125-47:  Suoer Jock by D. Royal
 Midwood 125-48:  The Doll Game by Odda deLazzo
 Midwood 125-49:  Nymphs-Horses-Men by Walter F. Levereaux
 Midwood 125-50:  Circuit-Breaker by Veronica King
 Midwood 125-51:  Busted by Dirk Ramport
 Midwood 125-52:  Speak No Evil by Virgo
 Midwood 125-53:  The Mating Game by Tim Lang
 Midwood 125-54:  
 Midwood 125-55:  
 Midwood 125-56:  Nashville Rebel by Carter Cash
 Midwood 125-57:  Bill & Carol & Tom & Ellie by J.J. Madison
 Midwood 125-58:  Schoool For Scandal by Vince Deluca
 Midwood 125-59:  The Cheapest Thrill by Abbie Kaufman
 Midwood 125-60:  
 Midwood 125-61:  Any Way You Want It by Kermit Klitch
 Midwood 125-62:  How They Do It In China by Mei-en Lu
 Midwood 125-63:  Friction by Cynthia
 Midwood 125-64:  
 Midwood 125-65:  Swallow The Leader by John Cleve
 Midwood 125-66:  Point Red by Veronica
 Midwood 125-67:  The Big Spread by Percy Stevenson
 Midwood 125-68:  
 Midwood 125-69:  
 Midwood 125-70:  Pulling Taffy by Tompkins Parke
 Midwood 125-71:  Balls by Samantha Rider
 Midwood 125-72:  Viva Sex by Sasha Sibacca
 Midwood 125-73:  Fresh Tail by Gerald Kramer
 Midwood 125-74:  Bang! by George Shaw
 Midwood 125-75:  The Mating by Eric Jay
 Midwood 125-76:  The Intimates by Dirk Ramport
 Midwood 125-77:  
 Midwood 125-78:  Track Tramp by Carl Driver
 Midwood 125-79:  Voyeur's Delight by Alan Bell
 Midwood 125-80:  
 Midwood 125-81:  Girls In A Thousand Windows by Kermit Klitch
 Midwood 125-82:  
 Midwood 125-83:  The Hottest Tip by Vince DeLuca
 Midwood 125-84:  Exposed by Burt Silver
 Midwood 125-85:  A Very Private Nurse by Jack Gunther
 Midwood 125-86:  Black Satin Sheets by Mike Winston
 Midwood 125-87:  Freeze... And Respond by Gil Johns
 Midwood 125-88:  The Passion Workers by Florence
 Midwood 125-89:  
 Midwood 125-90:  
 Midwood 125-91:  Soul Touch by Linda DuBreuil
 Midwood 125-92:  
 Midwood 125-93:  My, How You've Grown! by Richard Lupino
 Midwood 125-94:  On Her Back Again by Werner Hillenbrand
 Midwood 125-95:  Bare Strangers by George Myers
 Midwood 125-96:  Lie Down So We Can Talk by Werner Hillenbrand
 Midwood 125-97:  R.S.V.P. by If You Come by Jim Conway

MIDWOOD PRIVATE LIBRARY EDITIONS 
 
 Midwood 175-1:  Rock-A-Bye, Baby by George Shaw
 Midwood 175-2:  Blowout by Aldo Lucchesi
 Midwood 175-3:  The American Coed Scandal by Donna Sanford
 Midwood 175-4:  Vice And Consent by Marcus Pendanter
 Midwood 175-5:  Saint Of Lust by N
 Midwood 175-6:  Membranes by Gil Johns
 Midwood 175-7:  The Circle Device by Honey Potimkin
 Midwood 175-8:  Hoagie McAllisters Topless Airlines by Arjay Scott
 Midwood 175-9:  Confessions Of A Captive Sibyl by Pamela Kaye
 Midwood 175-10:  I Will Return And Claim My Bed by Max Nortic
 Midwood 175-11:  Rock Revel by Roderick Pullman
 Midwood 175-12:  This Book Rated "X" by Linda DuBreuil
 Midwood 175-13:  Shadow Of A Man by Jay Greene
 Midwood 175-14:  The Fire Island Dirty Dozen Minus 2 by Norman Jackson
 Midwood 175-15:  Daddy And Me, And Brother Makes Three by Serena Wilson
 Midwood 175-16:  The Diabolists by Wallace Arthur
 Midwood 175-17:  I, A Sensualist by Steven Barry
 Midwood 175-18:  Incest by R. Lambert
 Midwood 175-19:  Inferno Of Women by Ania Palmer
 Midwood 175-20:  The Carnals by Stan Mitchell
 Midwood 175-21:  Satyricon 70 by Roberto
 Midwood 175-22:  Sliding In by Guy Martin
 Midwood 175-23:  Seed by John Cleve
 Midwood 175-24:  The Nurse Came Naked by Justine Haynes
 Midwood 175-25:  Island Of Desire by Max Nortic
 Midwood 175-26:  The Man Who Gathered Cherries by Peter Quinn
 Midwood 175-27:  Mardi Gras Madam by Emmett X. Reed
 Midwood 175-28:  Deeper And Deeper by J. Pinetree
 Midwood 175-29:  Juice Of Love by John Cleve
 Midwood 175-30:  Fanny Hell Blows Madison Avenue by Norman Jackson
 Midwood 175-31:  On Campus by Peter Kanto
 Midwood 175-32:  Midnight Trash by J.J. Madison
 Midwood 175-33:  
 Midwood 175-34:  House Of Pain by Virgo
 Midwood 175-35:  Shadow Of A Man by Jay Greene
 Midwood 175-36:  And Where She Stops Nobody Knows by Cynthia
 Midwood 175-37:  Exotic Experiments by Robert Evelyn
 Midwood 175-38:  Playing Dirty by Gloria Wilcox
 Midwood 175-39:  Crescendo by Stan Mitchell
 Midwood 175-40:  The Girl Who Couldn't Say No by Robert Lambert
 Midwood 175-41:  
 Midwood 175-42:  Mafia Mistress by Guy Martin
 Midwood 175-43:  The Grind by Duke Morrison
 Midwood 175-44:  Finger Man by Raphael deSantiago
 Midwood 175-45:  Stud Ranch by Gus Stevens
 Midwood 175-46:  The Throb by Vic Puccini
 Midwood 175-47:  The Ultimate Sin by Walter Levereaux
 Midwood 175-48:  Hot Flash by Robb Stanley
 Midwood 175-49:  Honey by Max Nortic
 Midwood 175-50:  
 Midwood 175-51:  Miss American Queen by Rosemary Bell
 Midwood 175-52:  
 Midwood 175-53:  
 Midwood 175-54:  
 Midwood 175-55:  
 Midwood 175-56:  The Second Coming by John Cleve

MIDWOOD PEACOCK AND CAMEO EDITIONS 
 
 Midwood 195-1:  House Of Illusion by Mitchell Criterion
 Midwood 195-2:  Poker Power by Robert Hadley
 Midwood 195-3:  
 Midwood 195-4:  Rest In Piece by Linda Dubreuil
 Midwood 195-5:  Gettin' It Together by Linda DuBreuil
 Midwood 195-6:  Man Hole by Chris Harrison
 Midwood 195-7:  Vegas Virgins by Gus Stevens
 Midwood 195-8:  Tycoon by Delmas Abbott
 Midwood 195-8:  Between Joy's Legs by Baron Wells
 Midwood 195-9:  Captives In The Chateau De Sade by John Cleve
 Midwood 195-10:  Cruising by Jay Greene
 Midwood 195-11:  Skin Flick Stud by Robert Hadley
 Midwood 195-12:  
 Midwood 195-13:  The Knickerbocker Report by Tom Knickerbocker
 Midwood 195-14:  Boys in The Bed by Niko Stavros
 Midwood 195-15:  Night Stick by D. Royal
 Midwood 195-16:  Entry by ?
 Midwood 195-17:  Obsession by H.M.
 Midwood 195-18:  The Body Shop by J.J. Madison
 Midwood 195-19:  Syndicate Sex by Michael Criterion
 Midwood 195-20:  The Real Thing by Max Nortic
 Midwood 195-21:  Erotica Satanica by Morgana Trehune
 Midwood 195-22:  The Godson by Jay Greene
 Midwood 195-23:  Black Man's Harem by John Cleve
 Midwood 195-24:  Obedience by Mason Campbell
 Midwood 195-25:  Measurements by Unknown
 Midwood 195-26:  
 Midwood 195-27:  And Then Came... by John Bailey
 Midwood 195-28:  Gamecock by Guy Martin
 Midwood 195-29:  The Devoured by John Cleve
 Midwood 195-30:  The Dirtiest Dozen by Derek Miles
 Midwood 195-31:  Ohhhhh, It Feels Like Dying by J.J. Madison
 Midwood 195-32:  
 Midwood 195-33:  Feel Me, Smell Me, Taste Me by Esme Glasse
 Midwood 195-34:  
 Midwood 195-35:  Men's Room by Jay Greene
 Midwood 195-36:  When Virtue Fails by Hardy Peters
 Midwood 195-37:  Come Together by Angus McClintock
 Midwood 195-38:  Blow Gently by Dallas Kovar
 Midwood 195-39:  Too Much Is Not Enough by Peter McCurtin
 Midwood 195-40:  Gypsy Virgin [aka 'Code Name Gypsy Virgin'] by Max Nortic
 Midwood 195-41:  
 Midwood 195-42:  
 Midwood 195-43:  What's Up? by Chuck Watts
 Midwood 195-44:  
 Midwood 195-45:  Pussy Island by John Cleve
 Midwood 195-46:  Bare It by Peter Quinn
 Midwood 195-47:  Seduction Service by Armand Coutot
 Midwood 195-48:  
 Midwood 195-49:  Now I Lay Me by Mason Campbell
 Midwood 195-50:  Lay-Away by George Myers
 Midwood 195-51:  Out Of The Closet - Six Stories For Males by Michael Douglass
 Midwood 195-52:  
 Midwood 195-53:  
 Midwood 195-54:  
 Midwood 195-55:  Nookie by Jim Conaway
 Midwood 195-56:  
 Midwood 195-57:  Full-Blown by Chris Harrison
 Midwood 195-58:  Lust Trail by Craig Morris
 Midwood 195-59:  Blue Nymph by Nancy Taggart
 Midwood 195-60:  Thunderballs by Michael Packard
 Midwood 195-61:  
 Midwood 195-62:  Sex For Sale by Linda & Henry Commings
 Midwood 195-63:  
 Midwood 195-64:  Name Your Pleasure by Joyce Y.
 Midwood 195-65:  Take It As It Comes by Michael Douglass
 Midwood 195-66:  
 Midwood 195-67:  
 Midwood 195-68:  Teach Me by Shana Rae
 Midwood 195-69:  Sheila's Sins by Gil Johns
 Midwood 195-70:  Sex Shack by Delmas Abbott
 Midwood 195-71:  
 Midwood 195-72:  Bedtime Babysitter by Odda deLazzo
 Midwood 195-73:  
 Midwood 195-74:  
 Midwood 195-75:  Sexual Fetishism by Dirk Malloy
 Midwood 195-76:  Manhandled by Chris Harrison
 Midwood 195-77:  
 Midwood 195-78:  
 Midwood 195-79:  Depraved Angel by Rosemary Santini
 Midwood 195-80:  Private Performance by Micheal Enright
 Midwood 195-81:  Willing Flesh by R. Lambert
 Midwood 195-82:  
 Midwood 195-83:  
 Midwood 195-84:  
 Midwood 195-85:  Sisters In Sin by Gerald Kramer
 Midwood 195-86:  A Lesbian's Lesson by ?
 Midwood 195-87:  Cockeye by Onyx D'or
 Midwood 195-88:  Farm Stud by Jackson Marsh
 Midwood 195-89:  Brenda's Last Fling by Veronica King
 Midwood 195-90:  Dirty Secrets by Max Nortic
 Midwood 195-91:  
 Midwood 195-92:  
 Midwood 195-93:  Woman Scent by Christopher Hunt
 Midwood 195-94:  
 Midwood 195-95:  A Beautiful Piece by James Miller
 Midwood 195-96:  Deep And Warm by Jacque Etienne
 Midwood 195-97:  A Little Lower... by Aldo Lucchesi
 Midwood 195-98:  House Of Leather by Jim Conway
 Midwood 195-99:  Hot Co-Ed by Leslie Hunter
 Midwood 195-100:  
 Midwood 195-101:  Rita's Tongue by Jackson Marsh
 Midwood 195-102:  
 Midwood 195-103:  
 Midwood 195-104:  Snatch by Israel Krupp
 Midwood 195-105:  
 Midwood 195-106:  
 Midwood 195-107:  
 Midwood 195-108:  Flesh Session by Robin Townsend
 Midwood 195-109:  
 Midwood 195-110:  Thick And Throbbing by Cliff David
 Midwood 195-111:  Lust's Diary by Ross Kennedy
 Midwood 195-112:  
 Midwood 195-113:  Flesh And Leather [aka 'Let's Go Lust'] by Simeon Morris
 Midwood 195-114:  
 Midwood 195-115:  Love Lips by Emerald Evans
 Midwood 195-116:  
 Midwood 195-117:  
 Midwood 195-118:  Shove It by Jud Marsh
 Midwood 195-119:  Hard Rider by Conrad Grimes
 Midwood 195-120:  Vicky Is Coming by Cheryl Wood
 Midwood 195-121:  Big Blonde Swede by Jorge Valentine
 Midwood 195-122:  The Size Of It by Jay Greene
 Midwood 195-123:  From A Lesbian's Lips by Dallas Mayo
 Midwood 195-124:  Summer-Camp Slut by Beth Harris
 Midwood 195-125:  
 Midwood 195-126:  Family Fun [aka 'Sins Of Our Father'] by Kenneth Payne
 Midwood 195-127:  A Brother's Lust by Emerald Evans
 Midwood 195-128:  Teen-Age Tramps by Robert Evelyn
 Midwood 195-129:  Hot And Raw by Jud Marsh
 Midwood 195-130:  Sticky Pants by Arnold Pennington
 Midwood 195-131:  
 Midwood 195-132:  A Juicy Piece by Jon Mason
 Midwood 195-133:  Hungry Women by James Oxford
 Midwood 195-134:  
 Midwood 195-135:  
 Midwood 195-136:  
 Midwood 195-137:  Just A Slut by Gerald Kramer
 Midwood 195-138:  Hanging Low by Jay Ericson
 Midwood 195-139:  
 Midwood 195-140:  Sweet Come by Guy Martin
 Midwood 195-141:  Aunt Vera's Nephew by Israel Krupp
 Midwood 195-142:  
 Midwood 195-143:  
 Midwood 195-144:  Cherry Pink by Brian Summers
 Midwood 195-145:  Pussy's Brother by Erik Hampden
 Midwood 195-146:  Caged by Roger St. Clair
 Midwood 195-147:  A Real Hot Number by Chris Simon
 Midwood 195-148:  Squeeze Play by Jack Parker
 Midwood 195-149:  Ruby's Tasty Pie by Micael Packard
 Midwood 195-150:  
 Midwood 195-151:  
 Midwood 195-152:  
 Midwood 195-153:  Bonnie's Photo Sessions by Robert Evelyn
 Midwood 195-154:  Straddle Me by J.J. Madison
 Midwood 195-155:  Cheryl's Honeymoon by Guy Martin

Midwood 60000 Series 

 Midwood 60101:  Ship Mates by Michael Adrian
 Midwood 60102:  Nympho Beach by Ronnie Di Peitro
 Midwood 60103:  Linda's Favorite Subject by Paul Rivers
 Midwood 60104:  Debbie's Master by Mason Capmbell
 Midwood 60105:  Karen Goes Wild by Angela Scott
 Midwood 60106:  
 Midwood 60107:  All Juiced Up by Veronica King
 Midwood 60108:  Blue Love by Thomas Conrad
 Midwood 60109:  Wanton Wife by Carolyn Shelby
 Midwood 60110:  
 Midwood 60111:  Coed Slut Party by Bonnie Eaton
 Midwood 60112:  Hitchhike "69" by Norm Philips
 Midwood 60113:  Cruise Ship by Jay Greene
 Midwood 60114:  
 Midwood 60115:  Sleeping Around by Michael Adrian
 Midwood 60116:  
 Midwood 60117:  
 Midwood 60118:  Sweet And Innocent by Debbie Wilcox
 Midwood 60119:  Hard Rock Sex by Gary Jameson
 Midwood 60120:  
 Midwood 60121:  
 Midwood 60122:  A Taste Of Pain by Jim Curry
 Midwood 60123:  Skin Flick Chick by Tony McBride
 Midwood 60124:  
 Midwood 60125:  
 Midwood 60126:  Lesbian Obsession by Kimberly Kemp
 Midwood 60127:  Patty's One Pleasure by Erik Hampden
 Midwood 60128:  Degraded by ?
 Midwood 60129:  Jeff's Trade by Roger St. Clair
 Midwood 60130:  Slut Ship by Michael Adrian
 Midwood 60131:  Action Girl by Dallas Mayo
 Midwood 60132:  Thrill Hungry by ?
 Midwood 60133:  Dial Sex by Gil Johns
 Midwood 60134:  A Coed Confession by ?
 Midwood 60135:  
 Midwood 60136:  
 Midwood 60137:  Sorority Sinners by ?
 Midwood 60138:  Bike Girl by Robert Moore
 Midwood 60138:  Flesh Ritual by Christopher Laine
 Midwood 60139:  Lori's Lesson by Sherry Berger
 Midwood 60140:  Teacher's Pets by Matt Dorrance
 Midwood 60141:  The Man Inside Me by Jay Greene
 Midwood 60142:  Daddy's Playmates by ?
 Midwood 60143:  COED! by June Curtiss
 Midwood 60144:  Handy Man by Stan Myers
 Midwood 60145:  
 Midwood 60146:  Tempting Daddy by I. Smithson
 Midwood 60147:  Down On The Farm by Brian Clemens
 Midwood 60148:  
 Midwood 60149:  Blow By Blow by Jay Greene
 Midwood 60150:  A Nest Of Lesbians by Dallas Mayo
 Midwood 60151:  Swap Motel by Gerald Kramer
 Midwood 60152:  
 Midwood 60153:  Summer Of '69 by Christopher Finley
 Midwood 60154:  
 Midwood 60155:  
 Midwood 60156:  Voyeur's Delight by Alan Bell
 Midwood 60157:  
 Midwood 60158:  Meet Marilyn by Thomas Cassidy
 Midwood 60159:  
 Midwood 60160:  Peggy Gets Hers by Stephen Morrison
 Midwood 60161:  Kevin's Big Number by John Dell
 Midwood 60162:  
 Midwood 60163:  
 Midwood 60164:  
 Midwood 60165:  
 Midwood 60166:  Miss Stuck-Up by Rob O'Neal
 Midwood 60167:  
 Midwood 60168:  
 Midwood 60169:  Come Again by Frederick Starr
 Midwood 60170:  Sweet Lips by Fletcher Hill
 Midwood 60171:  
 Midwood 60172:  After-School Swinger by Wesley Locke
 Midwood 60173:  The Colonel's Boy by Jay Greene
 Midwood 60174:  Syndicate Girl by Austin Barr
 Midwood 60175:  
 Midwood 60176:  Camera Cuties by Ephram Lord
 Midwood 60177:  Initiation To Sin by Ian Lederer
 Midwood 60178:  
 Midwood 60179:  
 Midwood 60180:  Sex-Circus Sisters by Jackie Vaste
 Midwood 60181:  Bonnie's Dilemma by Don Elcord
 Midwood 60182:  
 Midwood 60183:  
 Midwood 60184:  
 Midwood 60185:  
 Midwood 60186:  
 Midwood 60187:  
 Midwood 60188:  Donna's Delight by Randy Hale
 Midwood 60189:  Doctor Plays Dirty by Roy Battle
 Midwood 60190:  
 Midwood 60191:  Chico by Jay Greene
 Midwood 60192:  
 Midwood 60193:  Midnight Trash by J.J. Madison
 Midwood 60194:  Obedience by Mason Campbell
 Midwood 60195:  Pucker Power by Robert Hadley
 Midwood 60196:  Hot Flash by Robb Stanley
 Midwood 60197:  Locker-Room Lovers by Vito Della Strada
 Midwood 60198:  Sinful Sisters by Ricardo Santagata
 Midwood 60199:  
 Midwood 60200:  
 Midwood 60201:  Kathy's Fling by Sherry Berger
 Midwood 60202:  Party Doll by Stan Myers
 Midwood 60203:  Girl in Heat by George Devlin
 Midwood 60204:  
 Midwood 60205:  
 Midwood 60206:  
 Midwood 60207:  Captives In the Chateau De Sade by John Cleve
 Midwood 60208:  
 Midwood 60209:  
 Midwood 60210:  
 Midwood 60211:  I Feel It Coming by Jay Greene
 Midwood 60212:  Photo Orgy by Jack Parker
 Midwood 60213:  
 Midwood 60214:  
 Midwood 60215:  
 Midwood 60216:  
 Midwood 60217:  
 Midwood 60218:  Man Hole by Chris Harrison
 Midwood 60219:  Stud Ranch by Gus Stevens
 Midwood 60220:  
 Midwood 60221:  Inferno Of Women by Ania Palmer
 Midwood 60222:  
 Midwood 60223:  
 Midwood 60224:  
 Midwood 60225:  Pretty Boys Must Die by Steven Zady
 Midwood 60226:  My Secret Lesbian Life Volume I by Kimberly Kemp
 Midwood 60227:  
 Midwood 60228:  
 Midwood 60229:  Sex School Mistress by Emerald Evans
 Midwood 60230:  Baby Sister by Michael Packard
 Midwood 60231:  
 Midwood 60232:  
 Midwood 60233:  
 Midwood 60234:  
 Midwood 60235:  
 Midwood 60236:  The Sinner by Robert Eli
 Midwood 60237:  My Secret Lesbian Life Volume II by Kimberly Kemp
 Midwood 60238:  Lust's Revenge by John Dell
 Midwood 60239:  Honeymoon For Three by Seth Bates
 Midwood 60240:  Weekend Swap by Todd Edmond
 Midwood 60241:  Cheapest Girl In Town by Christopher Finley
 Midwood 60242:  Call It Sin by Austin Barr
 Midwood 60243:  Summer Of Shame by Vincent Church
 Midwood 60244:  Strange Sisters by Peter Stanley
 Midwood 60245:  Black Satin Sheets by Mike Winston
 Midwood 60246:  
 Midwood 60247:  
 Midwood 60248:  
 Midwood 60249:  
 Midwood 60250:  
 Midwood 60251:  
 Midwood 60252:  Hot Pursuit by C.C. Banyon
 Midwood 60253:  Doing Daddy by Samuel Sutton
 Midwood 60254:  
 Midwood 60255:  Willing Wanton by Gerald Kramer
 Midwood 60256:  
 Midwood 60257:  White Goddess by Chris Harrison
 Midwood 60258:  
 Midwood 60259:  
 Midwood 60260:  
 Midwood 60261:  High School Sinners by Godfrey Ramdigger
 Midwood 60262:  Love Means Never Saying No by Brian Hartley
 Midwood 60263:  
 Midwood 60264:  Lesbians Unlimited by Dallas Mayo
 Midwood 60265:  
 Midwood 60266:  Love Thy Brother by Ginger Craft
 Midwood 60267:  Once In Love With Amy by Seth Bates
 Midwood 60268:  Wild Cherry by John C. Douglas
 Midwood 60269:  Doing It With Doctor [aka 'Doing It With Doc' ] by Edwin Mozler
 Midwood 60270:  Heat by Stan Shafer
 Midwood 60271:  
 Midwood 60272:  Teen Tramp by Ricardo Santagata
 Midwood 60273:  
 Midwood 60274:  
 Midwood 60275:  
 Midwood 60276:  
 Midwood 60277:  Taking A Chance On Lust by Charles Hayes
 Midwood 60278:  
 Midwood 60279:  S As In Sensuous by John Denis
 Midwood 60280:  
 Midwood 60281:  
 Midwood 60282:  
 Midwood 60283:  Teaching Teacher by C.C. Banyon
 Midwood 60284:  Virgin Territory by Seymour Harris
 Midwood 60285:  Bush Country by Robert McAfee
 Midwood 60286:  
 Midwood 60287:  
 Midwood 60288:  
 Midwood 60289:  
 Midwood 60290:  
 Midwood 60291:  Lesbian On A Leash by Kimberly Kemp
 Midwood 60292:  Sticky Fingers by Ricardo Santagata
 Midwood 60293:  Plaything by Andrew Laird
 Midwood 60294:  Everybody's Girl by Marc Antoine
 Midwood 60295:  Sex Resort by Gerald Kramer
 Midwood 60296:  Summer Heat by Chris Harrison
 Midwood 60297:  
 Midwood 60298:  Love Spurt by Linda Dubreuil
 Midwood 60299:  Sheila by Preston Harriman
 Midwood 60300:  The Pleasure Plan by Marc Antoine
 Midwood 60301:  Brotherly Love by Annette Devin
 Midwood 60302:  Lost Innocence by Amanda King
 Midwood 60303:  Joy Journey by William Branch
 Midwood 60304:  Three Way Love by Bronc Calloway
 Midwood 60305:  
 Midwood 60306:  Tight Fit by John Denis
 Midwood 60307:  
 Midwood 60308:  Big Blonde Swede by Jorge Valentine
 Midwood 60309:  Come One-Come All by Gerald Kramer
 Midwood 60310:  Piece Meal by Dorsey Lang
 Midwood 60311:  
 Midwood 60312:  Wheel Of Lust by Justin George
 Midwood 60313:  Lesbian Dollhouse by Dallas Mayo
 Midwood 60314:  
 Midwood 60315:  Sex Doctor by John Denis
 Midwood 60316:  
 Midwood 60317:  Hot Sister by Brian Denny
 Midwood 60318:  Tanya's Secret by Randy Ronson
 Midwood 60319:  Code Name Gypsy Virgin [aka 'Gypsy Virgin'] by Max Nortic
 Midwood 60320:  House Of Illusion by Mitchell Criterion
 Midwood 60321:  Shared Beds by Marc Antoine
 Midwood 60322:  The Dominators by Robert Moore
 Midwood 60323:  Torrid by Norton McVickers
 Midwood 60324:  
 Midwood 60325:  Coming Alive by Collis Barker
 Midwood 60326:  Sexualis 1984 by Geoffrey Ramdagger
 Midwood 60327:  Captive Katie by A.K. Devries
 Midwood 60328:  A Cunning Among Lesbians by Kimberly Kemp
 Midwood 60329:  
 Midwood 60330:  
 Midwood 60331:  The Professor's Naughty Wife by Robert Viktor
 Midwood 60332:  Exposed by Burt Silver
 Midwood 60333:  Lip Service by Roy Battle
 Midwood 60334:  The Love Toy by Kieth Basso
 Midwood 60335:  5 Finger Exercise by Frank D. Reeve
 Midwood 60336:  The Score by Collis Barker
 Midwood 60337:  Beth's Private Lessons by Annette Devin
 Midwood 60338:  
 Midwood 60339:  Naked Caller by Randy Hale
 Midwood 60340:  His Sister Taught Him by Robert McAfee
 Midwood 60341:  Luscious by Paul Grant
 Midwood 60342:  Ericka's Magic Touch by Jason Hytes
 Midwood 60343:  
 Midwood 60344:  Brenda's Last Fling by Veronica King
 Midwood 60345:  
 Midwood 60346:  Bitter Hunger by A.K. DeVries
 Midwood 60347:  Society Tramp by Collis Barker
 Midwood 60348:  Swappers Unlimited by George Devlin
 Midwood 60349:  Savage Sinners by John Ellis
 Midwood 60350:  
 Midwood 60351:  Four Of A Kind by Jason Hytes
 Midwood 60352:  Private Sessions by March Hastings
 Midwood 60353:  
 Midwood 60354:  
 Midwood 60355:  Tempting Daddy by I. Smithson
 Midwood 60356:  Twisted Flesh by George Myers
 Midwood 60357:  Lessons In Lesbian Love by Dallas Mayo
 Midwood 60358:  Greta by Jason Hytes
 Midwood 60359:  Flesh Session by Robin Townsend
 Midwood 60360:  NightWatch by Keith Basso
 Midwood 60361:  
 Midwood 60362:  
 Midwood 60363:  Two-Way Stretch by Claudia Cole
 Midwood 60364:  Sweet Sinner by Frank D. Reeve
 Midwood 60365:  The Outsiders by Robert Conrad
 Midwood 60366:  The Hustler by Sloan Britain
 Midwood 60367:  The Group by John Turner
 Midwood 60368:  
 Midwood 60369:  
 Midwood 60370:  Rest In Piece by Linda Dubrueil
 Midwood 60371:  Open House by Sloan Britain
 Midwood 60372:  
 Midwood 60373:  
 Midwood 60374:  The Boss' Wife by Ben Doughty
 Midwood 60375:  In Their Cups by Honey Potimkin
 Midwood 60376:  Over-Developed by Jason Hytes
 Midwood 60377:  
 Midwood 60378:  The Fluffy Girl by Dallas Mayo
 Midwood 60379:  Carol by Dorsey Lang
 Midwood 60380:  Waters Of Desire by Brad Curtiss
 Midwood 60381:  Sister Nymphs by Dora Carl
 Midwood 60382:  Silk Stockings by Carlton Lake
 Midwood 60383:  Heat Of Passion by Scott Morris
 Midwood 60384:  
 Midwood 60385:  Dark Desires by Jason Hytes
 Midwood 60386:  
 Midwood 60387:  The Hungry Years by George Devlin
 Midwood 60388:  Voodoo Nights by Russell Smith [NOT RELEASED]
 Midwood 60389:  The Horizontal Hours by Keith Basso
 Midwood 60390:  A Pocketfull by Imo Yashima
 Midwood 60391:  
 Midwood 60392:  
 Midwood 60393:  The Yes Girl by Jerri Dugan
 Midwood 60394:  Secrets by Dora Carl
 Midwood 60395:  Girls School by Chris Harrison
 Midwood 60396:  The Way We Are by Jason Hytes
 Midwood 60397:  Girls In A Thousand Windows
 Midwood 60398:  Trapped by Roy L. Couch
 Midwood 60399:  Wild Child by Frank D. Reeve
 Midwood 60400:  The Velvet Touch by Robert Hadley
 Midwood 60401:  
 Midwood 60402:  
 Midwood 60403:  Interlude by Frank D. Reeve
 Midwood 60404:  R.S.V.P. by Jim Conway
 Midwood 60405:  
 Midwood 60406:  Play By Play by Collis Baker
 Midwood 60407:  
 Midwood 60408:  Miyoko's World by Imo Yashima
 Midwood 60409:  
 Midwood 60410:  
 Midwood 60411:  
 Midwood 60412:  
 Midwood 60413:  Bedeviled by Russell Smith
 Midwood 60414:  The Making Of Marianne by Frank D. Reeve
 Midwood 60415:  Blue Nymph by Nancy Taggart
 Midwood 60416:  Felicia by Tod Parker
 Midwood 60417:  Reckless by Chris Harrison
 Midwood 60418:  
 Midwood 60419:  
 Midwood 60420:  Sweet Lips by Joseph Arrowsmith
 Midwood 60421:  Lovely Rogue by Thomas Morley
 Midwood 60422:  
 Midwood 60423:  
 Midwood 60424:  
 Midwood 60425:  Shadows by Frank D. Reeve
 Midwood 60426:  The Second Time Around by Keith Basso
 Midwood 60427:  
 Midwood 60428:  
 Midwood 60429:  On The Road by Joseph Arrowsmith
 Midwood 60430:  
 Midwood 60431:  Wife Next Door by George Devlin
 Midwood 60432:  The Love Seekers by Gerald Kramer
 Midwood 60433:  Her Magic Spell [aka 'On My Throbbing Engine'] by Jason Hytes
 Midwood 60434:  
 Midwood 60435:  Speak No Evil by Virgo
 Midwood 60436:  
 Midwood 60437:  Suzy's Secret by Kirby Fuentes
 Midwood 60438:  
 Midwood 60439:  
 Midwood 60440:  I Am Curious by Montgomery Popoff
 Midwood 60441:  
 Midwood 60442:  Confidentially Yours Joanne by Keith Basso
 Midwood 60443:  Moonglow [aka 'Night Of The Wolf'] by T.J. Flowers
 Midwood 60444:  That Wonderful Need by Geoffrey Ramdagger
 Midwood 60445:  Pretty Baby by Sloan Britain
 Midwood 60446:  The Cheapest Thrill by Abbie Kaufmann
 Midwood 60447:  Happy Hips by Dorsey Lang
 Midwood 60448:  Girlstown by Dallas Mayo
 Midwood 60449:  Teen Bride Adult by Don Elcord
 Midwood 60450:  Isle Of Love by Dora Carl
 Midwood 60451:  
 Midwood 60452:  Pale Throat by Carlton Lake
 Midwood 60453:  Soft Shoulders by John Denis
 Midwood 60454:  Cloud Nine by Roy L. Couch
 Midwood 60455:  Rosa's Way by Joseph Arrowsmith
 Midwood 60456:  Route 69 by Chris Harrison
 Midwood 60457:  Body Heat by Gerald Kramer
 Midwood 60458:  So Bad by T.J. Flowers
 Midwood 60459:  
 Midwood 60460:  Indoor Sports by Jack Walker
 Midwood 60461:  
 Midwood 60462:  Tycoon by Delmas Abbott
 Midwood 60463:  
 Midwood 60464:  Obsession by H.M.
 Midwood 60465:  Making Mary by Dora Carl
 Midwood 60466:  
 Midwood 60467:  Twisted by Chris Harrison
 Midwood 60468:  
 Midwood 60469:  
 Midwood 60470:  
 Midwood 60471:  Angela by Russell Smith [NOT RELEASED]
 Midwood 60472:  
 Midwood 60473:  The Secret by Dallas Mayo
 Midwood 60474:  Pillow Talk by Sloan Britain
 Midwood 60475:  Moon Babies by Eric Jay
 Midwood 60476:  Hard Rider by Conrad Grimes
 Midwood 60477:  Open Kiss by Ivan Zummo
 Midwood 60478:  Pick-Up by Joseph Arrowsmith
 Midwood 60479:  Velvet Lips by Chris Harrison
 Midwood 60480:  Three Ways To Love by Guy Martin
 Midwood 60481:  So Soft by Ed Shaugnessy
 Midwood 60482:  
 Midwood 60483:  Rock-A-Bye, Baby by George Shaw
 Midwood 60484:  The Insatiables by Guy Martin
 Midwood 60485:  The Big Ball by Marcus Pendanter
 Midwood 60486:  Angel Of The Morning by James Miller
 Midwood 60487:  Up And Coming by Bruce Elliot
 Midwood 60488:  The Act Of Acts by Wade Graham
 Midwood 60489:  Second-Hand Girl by Rona West
 Midwood 60490:  
 Midwood 60491:  
 Midwood 60492:  Hanging Loose by Sloan Britain
 Midwood 60493:  While The Cat's Away by Jack Walker
 Midwood 60494:  
 Midwood 60495:  The Action Girls by Rick Raymond
 Midwood 60496:  Nymph by Dorsey Lang
 Midwood 60497:  Juice Of Love by John Cleve
 Midwood 60498:  The Mating by Eric Jay
 Midwood 60499:  Sweet Lips by Fletcher Hill
 Midwood 60500:  Any Man, Any Time by Michael Packard
 Midwood 60501:  
 Midwood 60502:  
 Midwood 60503:  
 Midwood 60504:  
 Midwood 60505:  
 Midwood 60506:  Golden Thighs by Carlton Lake
 Midwood 60507:  Bad Sister by Roy Battle
 Midwood 60508:  Pain & Pleasure by Chris Harrison
 Midwood 60509:  Doctor's Girl by ?
 Midwood 60510:  The Hurry-Up Girl by Dora Carl
 Midwood 60511:  Wild Summer by Dan Marks
 Midwood 60512:  
 Midwood 60513:  
 Midwood 60514:  Prescription - Sex by James Dobbins
 Midwood 60515:  
 Midwood 60516:  X-Rated Nurse by ?
 Midwood 60517:  Family Secrets by Chris Harrison
 Midwood 60518:  His Sister, Nicole by Kirby Fuentes
 Midwood 60519:  Company Girls by Kirby Fuentes
 Midwood 60520:  The Hungry Mouth by Russell Smith [NOT RELEASED]
 Midwood 60521:  Quartette by Jonathon Quist
 Midwood 60522:  Naughty Rider by Max Vanallen
 Midwood 60523:  When She Was Bad by B.F. Dickens
 Midwood 60524:  Pucker Power by Robert Handley
 Midwood 60525:  The Hello Kiss by Mason Tibbs
 Midwood 60526:  Girl From Everywhere by Dora Carl
 Midwood 60527:  The Jumpers by ?
 Midwood 60528:  Tarnished by Gus Stevens
 Midwood 60529:  The Swingers by Ted Kittering
 Midwood 60530:  Street People by Bud Drake
 Midwood 60531:  
 Midwood 60532:  Flesh And Leather [aka 'Let's Go Lust'] by Simeon Morris
 Midwood 60533:  A Little Lower by Aldo Lucchesi
 Midwood 60534:  
 Midwood 60535:  Dirty Secrets by Max Nortic
 Midwood 60536:  Cheap Blonde by Don Elord
 Midwood 60537:  Careless Karen by Lloyd Veech
 Midwood 60538:  
 Midwood 60539:  Hay Girl by Frank Henderson
 Midwood 60540:  Never Too Much by Jack Walker
 Midwood 60541:  
 Midwood 60542:  Neighborly Affairs by Don Elcord
 Midwood 60543:  
 Midwood 60544:  Peggy Gets Hers by Stephen Morrison
 Midwood 60545:  The Size Of It by Jay Greene
 Midwood 60546:  
 Midwood 60547:  Hot Pants by Stan Lambert
 Midwood 60548:  
 Midwood 60549:  My Son, My Lover by Mason Tibbs
 Midwood 60550:  
 Midwood 60551:  Open House by Guy Martin
 Midwood 60552:  Love Wagon by Joseph Arrowsmith
 Midwood 60553:  Delicious Tramp by Kirby Fuentes
 Midwood 60554:  
 Midwood 60555:  
 Midwood 60556:  
 Midwood 60557:  Blow Gently by Dallas Kovar
 Midwood 60558:  Family Circle by Robert Victor
 Midwood 60559:  
 Midwood 60560:  
 Midwood 60561:  Silky by Dallas Mayo
 Midwood 60562:  Come And Get It by Morgan Sears
 Midwood 60563:  Runaway by Ted Kittering
 Midwood 60564:  Never Enough by Sloan Britton
 Midwood 60565:  Girl In The Red Bikini [aka 'Bikini Girl'] by George Devlin
 Midwood 60566:  Private Boy [aka 'Nothing To It' or 'Her Private Boy'] by Raphael Blasi
 Midwood 60567:  
 Midwood 60568:  Around The World by Bud Drake
 Midwood 60569:  Locker-Room Lovers by Vito Della Strada
 Midwood 60570:  
 Midwood 60571:  Shove It by Jud Marsh
 Midwood 60572:  Skin Flick Stud by Robert Hadley
 Midwood 60573:  Darling Daughter by Joseph Arrowsmith
 Midwood 60574:  Joy Ride by Will Rudd
 Midwood 60575:  Executive Sweet by Jack Walker
 Midwood 60576:  Hot Girl by ?
 Midwood 60577:  Summer Love by Don Elcord
 Midwood 60578:  
 Midwood 60579:  G-String Girl by Kirby Fuentes
 Midwood 60580:  
 Midwood 60581:  Cockeye by Onyx D'Or
 Midwood 60582:  Blue Nymph by Nancy Taggart
 Midwood 60583:  
 Midwood 60584:  
 Midwood 60585:  
 Midwood 60586:  The Kissing Whip by Dallas Mayo
 Midwood 60587:  Water Sports by Joseph Arrowsmith
 Midwood 60588:  
 Midwood 60589:  
 Midwood 60590:  
 Midwood 60591:  
 Midwood 60592:  
 Midwood 60593:  Obedience by Mason Campbell
 Midwood 60594:  Sex-Circus Sisters by Jack Vaste
 Midwood 60595:  Hitchhike '69' by Norm Philips
 Midwood 60596:  Farm Stud by ?
 Midwood 60597:  Gang Bang by ?
 Midwood 60598:  Dr. Feelgood by Chris Harrison
 Midwood 60599:  Flaky by Kirby Fluentes
 Midwood 60600:  Young And Hot by ?
 Midwood 60601:  Mouth To Mouth by Jason Hyte
 Midwood 60602:  French Ways by Bud Drake
 Midwood 60603:  The Ultimate Sin by Walter Levereaux
 Midwood 60604:  Hot-Tongue Honey by Harvey Birch
 Midwood 60605:  Abby Opens Up by Andrew Laird
 Midwood 60606:  Silken Idol by Robert Moore
 Midwood 60607:  Boys In The Bed by Nick Stavros
 Midwood 60608:  Lesbian Interlude by Dallas Mayo
 Midwood 60609:  Go Down, Angel by Jeff Curry
 Midwood 60610:  
 Midwood 60611:  
 Midwood 60612:  The Husband Taster by Don Elcord
 Midwood 60613:  Chico by Jay Greene
 Midwood 60614:  Hot And Tight by John C. Douglas
 Midwood 60615:  A Degrading Affair by Bert Phelan
 Midwood 60616:  Camera Cuties by Ephram Lord
 Midwood 60617:  
 Midwood 60618:  Girl In Heat by George Devlin
 Midwood 60619:  Squeeze Play by Jack Parker
 Midwood 60620:  Carnal Cousins by Jack Vaste
 Midwood 60621:  Pleasure Street by ?
 Midwood 60622:  Free Samples by ?
 Midwood 60623:  Overripe by Ginger Craft
 Midwood 60624:  Sex Kitten by Jason Hyte
 Midwood 60625:  French Job by Florence King
 Midwood 60626:  Flesh Trade by ?
 Midwood 60627:  Donna's Delight by Randy Hale
 Midwood 60628:  Come Again by Frederick Starr
 Midwood 60629:  Sorority Sinners by ?
 Midwood 60630:  Meet Marilyn by Thomas Cassidy
 Midwood 60631:  Young Stuff by Gene Evans
 Midwood 60632:  Hot And Raw by Jud Marsh
 Midwood 60633:  
 Midwood 60634:  Go-Go Boys by ?
 Midwood 60635:  The Leather Game by Dora Carl
 Midwood 60636:  Everybody's Girl by Joseph Arrowsmith
 Midwood 60637:  Pussy's Brother by Erik Hampton
 Midwood 60638:  A Good Licking by J.J. Madison
 Midwood 60639:  After-School Swinger by Wesley Locke
 Midwood 60640:  
 Midwood 60641:  Skin Flick Chick by Tony McBride
 Midwood 60642:  
 Midwood 60643:  Three For Pain by Jack O. Stange
 Midwood 60644:  
 Midwood 60645:  
 Midwood 60646:  For Women Only by Dallas Mayo
 Midwood 60647:  Gay Exorcist by Michael Scott
 Midwood 60648:  Nino by Jay Greene
 Midwood 60649:  
 Midwood 60650:  
 Midwood 60651:  
 Midwood 60652:  The Bisexuals by Jim Curry
 Midwood 60653:  Kathy's Fling by Sherry Berger
 Midwood 60654:  Down On The Farm by Brian Clemens
 Midwood 60655:  Summer Of '69 by Christopher Finley
 Midwood 60656:  A Real Hot Number by Chris Simon
 Midwood 60657:  Daddy's Playmates by Brad Duffield
 Midwood 60658:  Reckless Flesh by Ben Doughty
 Midwood 60659:  
 Midwood 60660:  
 Midwood 60661:  Different - The Girls Of Summer by Arnold Evans
 Midwood 60662:  Enraptured Lovers by March Hastings
 Midwood 60663:  Gay Cruise by Michael Scott
 Midwood 60664:  Black Hustler by Butch Temple
 Midwood 60665:  
 Midwood 60666:  Slaves To Pain by Jack O. Strange
 Midwood 60667:  
 Midwood 60668:  
 Midwood 60669:  
 Midwood 60670:  Shampoo Girl by Michael Jones
 Midwood 60671:  
 Midwood 60672:  Handy Man by Stan Myers
 Midwood 60673:  Shared Beds by Marc Antoine
 Midwood 60674:  Honeymoon For Three by Seth Bates
 Midwood 60675:  Nymph by Gil Johns
 Midwood 60676:  Virgin Territory by Seymour Harris
 Midwood 60677:  Gay Bikers by Michael Scott
 Midwood 60678:  More by Jay Greene
 Midwood 60679:  
 Midwood 60680:  Women by Terry Fisher
 Midwood 60681:  Princess Of Pain by Bill Harris
 Midwood 60682:  
 Midwood 60683:  
 Midwood 60684:  
 Midwood 60685:  Massage Sensation by Roy Tilman
 Midwood 60686:  Practice Does It by John Clayton
 Midwood 60687:  
 Midwood 60688:  Three Way Love by Bronc Calloway
 Midwood 60689:  
 Midwood 60690:  Tanya's Secret by Randy Ronson
 Midwood 60691:  
 Midwood 60692:  
 Midwood 60693:  
 Midwood 60694:  Two Wives' Pleasure by Maria Amore
 Midwood 60695:  Gay Street Twins by Beau Jeffries
 Midwood 60696:  Private Passions by Michael Scott
 Midwood 60697:  
 Midwood 60698:  
 Midwood 60699:  Willing Thighs by Bill Harris
 Midwood 60700:  The Peepers by Dennis Roberts
 Midwood 60701:  Hungry Wives by Guy Sanders
 Midwood 60702:  
 Midwood 60703:  
 Midwood 60704:  Cherry Pink by Brian Summers
 Midwood 60705:  Weekend Swap by Todd Edmund
 Midwood 60706:  Summer Of Shame by Vincent Church
 Midwood 60707:  Teen Tramp by Ricardo Santagata
 Midwood 60708:  
 Midwood 60709:  Slaves & Masters [aka 'Slaves And Masters'] by Tom Hartman
 Midwood 60710:  Leather Fist by Hal Halstead
 Midwood 60711:  Lesbian Slave by Lee Garimond
 Midwood 60712:  
 Midwood 60713:  
 Midwood 60714:  Hotel Lust by Lee Server
 Midwood 60715:  Gay Psycho by Michael Scott
 Midwood 60716:  Sleep-In Women by Kirby Fuentes
 Midwood 60717:  Leather Cycle by Jack Walker
 Midwood 60718:  Gay Women by Maria Amore
 Midwood 60719:  Willing Flesh by R. Lambert
 Midwood 60720:  Voyeur's Delight by Alan Bell
 Midwood 60721:  
 Midwood 60722:  
 Midwood 60723:  
 Midwood 60724:  
 Midwood 60725:  Neighborhood Swap by Don Elcord
 Midwood 60726:  
 Midwood 60727:  Bare It, Charity [aka 'Bare It'] by Peter Quinn
 Midwood 60728:  Shame On Charlotte by Preston Harriman
 Midwood 60729:  
 Midwood 60730:  
 Midwood 60731:  
 Midwood 60732:  
 Midwood 60733:  The Gay Kidnappers by Butch Temple
 Midwood 60734:  
 Midwood 60735:  Wild Cherry by John C. Douglas
 Midwood 60736:  Torrid by Norton McVickers
 Midwood 60737:  
 Midwood 60738:  Doing It With Doc [aka 'Doing It With Doctor'] by Edwin Mozler
 Midwood 60739:  Love Spurt by Linda Dubreuil
 Midwood 60740:  Tight Fit by John Denis
 Midwood 60741:  Hot Pursuit by C.C. Banyon
 Midwood 60742:  
 Midwood 60743:  
 Midwood 60744:  Cheapest Girl In Town by Christopher Finley
 Midwood 60745:  Body Shop by Butch Temple
 Midwood 60746:  
 Midwood 60747:  
 Midwood 60748:  
 Midwood 60749:  
 Midwood 60750:  High School Hustlers by Jay Greene
 Midwood 60751:  Heat by Stan Shafer
 Midwood 60752:  Paula's Passion by Ralph Burgess
 Midwood 60753:  
 Midwood 60754:  Sensuous Showgirl by Preston Harriman
 Midwood 60755:  
 Midwood 60756:  
 Midwood 60757:  
 Midwood 60758:  Daddy's Darling by Todd Edmund
 Midwood 60759:  Naked Caller by Randy Hale
 Midwood 60760:  
 Midwood 60761:  Lady Sings The Hots by Dorsey Lang
 Midwood 60762:  Raunchy Rio by Jim Curry
 Midwood 60763:  
 Midwood 60764:  
 Midwood 60765:  Behind These Walls by Jay Greene
 Midwood 60766:  Lollipop Girl by Chris Harrison
 Midwood 60767:  
 Midwood 60768:  His Sister Taught Him by Robert Mcafee
 Midwood 60769:  
 Midwood 60770:  Once Upon A Bed by Stan Shafer
 Midwood 60771:  Erica's Magic Touch by Jason Hytes
 Midwood 60772:  Strong In The Saddle by Bret Steele
 Midwood 60773:  
 Midwood 60774:  
 Midwood 60775:  
 Midwood 60776:  
 Midwood 60777:  Swinging Cop by Bud Drake
 Midwood 60778:  
 Midwood 60779:  
 Midwood 60780:  Sweet Cream by Dallas Mayo
 Midwood 60781:  Dark Horse Stud by Bud Drake
 Midwood 60782:  The Flasher by Kirby Fuentes
 Midwood 60783:  French Trip by Robert Wahl
 Midwood 60784:  
 Midwood 60785:  
 Midwood 60786:  
 Midwood 60787:  
 Midwood 60788:  
 Midwood 60789:  Plaything by Andrew Laird
 Midwood 60790:  
 Midwood 60791:  
 Midwood 60792:  
 Midwood 60793:  
 Midwood 60794:  
 Midwood 60795:  
 Midwood 60796:  
 Midwood 60797:  
 Midwood 60798:  Caged by Roger St. Clair
 Midwood 60799:  
 Midwood 60800:  
 Midwood 60801:  
 Midwood 60802:  
 Midwood 60803:  
 Midwood 60804:  
 Midwood 60805:  Hot Sister by Brian Denny
 Midwood 60806:  
 Midwood 60807:  Lost Innocence by Amanda King
 Midwood 60808:  The Dominators by Robert Moore
 Midwood 60809:  
 Midwood 60810:  
 Midwood 60811:  
 Midwood 60812:  
 Midwood 60813:  
 Midwood 60814:  
 Midwood 60815:  Inside Eve by Todd Edmund
 Midwood 60816:  
 Midwood 60817:  Degraded Teenager by Vincent Church
 Midwood 60818:  
 Midwood 60819:  
 Midwood 60820:  Captive Virgin by Hank Watson
 Midwood 60821:  
 Midwood 60822:  Bonnie's Dilemma by Don Elcord
 Midwood 60823:  
 Midwood 60824:  Lay-Away by George Myers
 Midwood 60825:  
 Midwood 60826:  
 Midwood 60827:  Easy Entry by Joseph Arrowsmith
 Midwood 60828:  
 Midwood 60829:  
 Midwood 60830:  
 Midwood 60831:  
 Midwood 60832:  Eager Numpho by Kirby Fuentes
 Midwood 60833:  Sticky Pants by Arnold Pennington
 Midwood 60834:  
 Midwood 60835:  Waters Of Desire by Brad Curtis
 Midwood 60836:  
 Midwood 60837:  
 Midwood 60838:  
 Midwood 60839:  Spurt By Spurt by Jackie Powell
 Midwood 60840:  Anxious To Please by Rob Morreale
 Midwood 60841:  
 Midwood 60842:  
 Midwood 60843:  
 Midwood 60844:  Turned On Nympho by Joseph Arrowsmith
 Midwood 60845:  
 Midwood 60846:  Willing Housewives by Del Marks
 Midwood 60847:  
 Midwood 60848:  Massage Girl by Jay Wood
 Midwood 60849:  Private Sessions by March Hastings
 Midwood 60850:  
 Midwood 60851:  
 Midwood 60852:  
 Midwood 60853:  
 Midwood 60854:  Swappers Unlimited by George Devlin
 Midwood 60855:  
 Midwood 60856:  Flesh Ritual by Christopher Laine
 Midwood 60857:  Girl On The Loose by Lee Server
 Midwood 60858:  
 Midwood 60859:  Swedish Sinners by Micael Scott
 Midwood 60860:  
 Midwood 60861:  
 Midwood 60862:  
 Midwood 60863:  
 Midwood 60864:  Give Till It Hurts by Larry Hopkins
 Midwood 60865:  
 Midwood 60866:  The Hustler by Sloan Britain
 Midwood 60867:  
 Midwood 60868:  
 Midwood 60869:  
 Midwood 60870:  
 Midwood 60871:  
 Midwood 60872:  Mr. Stud by Michael Taber
 Midwood 60873:  Summer Camp by Jason Hyte
 Midwood 60874:  
 Midwood 60875:  Wildcat by Dora Carl
 Midwood 60876:  
 Midwood 60877:  
 Midwood 60878:  Housewife Hooker by Michael Scott
 Midwood 60879:  Love Doctor by Ralph Blasi
 Midwood 60880:  
 Midwood 60881:  
 Midwood 60882:  
 Midwood 60883:  
 Midwood 60884:  
 Midwood 60885:  
 Midwood 60886:  
 Midwood 60887:  
 Midwood 60888:  Undercover Agent by Noland Lake
 Midwood 60889:  Stroking by Lee Server
 Midwood 60890:  
 Midwood 60891:  
 Midwood 60892:  Hot Twins by Max Richards
 Midwood 60893:  
 Midwood 60894:  Massage Parlor by Del Marks
 Midwood 60895:  
 Midwood 60896:  Bad Girl In Town by George Devlin
 Midwood 60897:  
 Midwood 60898:  
 Midwood 60899:  What's Up? by Chuck Watts
 Midwood 60900:  
 Midwood 60901:  
 Midwood 60902:  Lesbian Dollhouse by Dallas Mayo
 Midwood 60903:  
 Midwood 60904:  The Farmer's Daughter by Dora Carl
 Midwood 60905:  
 Midwood 60906:  
 Midwood 60907:  Summer Sex by Jack O. Stange
 Midwood 60908:  
 Midwood 60909:  
 Midwood 60910:  
 Midwood 60911:  Rosa's Way by Joseph Arrowsmith
 Midwood 60912:  
 Midwood 60913:  Sister Nymphs by Dora Carl
 Midwood 60914:  
 Midwood 60915:  Sticky Fingers by Richard Santagata
 Midwood 60916:  
 Midwood 60917:  
 Midwood 60918:  
 Midwood 60919:  
 Midwood 60920:  
 Midwood 60921:  
 Midwood 60922:  Superstar Sex by Don Starr
 Midwood 60923:  
 Midwood 60924:  
 Midwood 60925:  
 Midwood 60926:  File Under 'Passion' by Michael Doren
 Midwood 60927:  Southern Hospitality by Ray L. Couch
 Midwood 60928:  
 Midwood 60929:  
 Midwood 60930:  Pool Of Loneliness by Dallas Mayo
 Midwood 60931:  
 Midwood 60932:  
 Midwood 60933:  On The Road by Joseph Arrowsmith
 Midwood 60934:  Wife Next Door by George Devlin
 Midwood 60935:  
 Midwood 60936:  
 Midwood 60937:  
 Midwood 60938:  Hungry Wife by Steven Zady
 Midwood 60939:  
 Midwood 60940:  
 Midwood 60941:  Flying by Jim Curry
 Midwood 60942:  
 Midwood 60943:  
 Midwood 60944:  
 Midwood 60945:  
 Midwood 60946:  Just Whistle by Joseph Arrowsmith
 Midwood 60947:  
 Midwood 60948:  
 Midwood 60949:  Turning On by Ray L. Couch
 Midwood 60950:  The Fluffy Girl by Dallas Mayo
 Midwood 60951:  
 Midwood 60952:  Lovely Rogue by Thomas Morely
 Midwood 60953:  
 Midwood 60954:  Bed Fun - Country Style by Dora Carl
 Midwood 60955:  Jezebels by Robert Wahl
 Midwood 60956:  Country Club Capers by Jim Curry
 Midwood 60957:  Fetish Paradise by Lee Server
 Midwood 60958:  
 Midwood 60959:  Dial Me For Love by Bud Drake
 Midwood 60960:  
 Midwood 60961:  
 Midwood 60962:  
 Midwood 60963:  Soft Shoulders by John Denis
 Midwood 60964:  Getting To Gloria by Gus Stevens
 Midwood 60965:  The Devil Made Me Do It by Guy Martin
 Midwood 60966:  
 Midwood 60967:  Nude Beauty by Merry Wood
 Midwood 60968:  
 Midwood 60969:  
 Midwood 60970:  The Sex Spa by Del Marks
 Midwood 60971:  
 Midwood 60972:  
 Midwood 60973:  
 Midwood 60974:  Patty's One Pleasure by Erik Hampden
 Midwood 60975:  
 Midwood 60976:  
 Midwood 60977:  
 Midwood 60978:  Sleeping Around by Marshall Jacks
 Midwood 60979:  Campus Lust by Tony McBride
 Midwood 60980:  Open Kiss by Ivan Zummo
 Midwood 60981:  
 Midwood 60982:  
 Midwood 60983:  So Tight by Jason Hytes
 Midwood 60984:  
 Midwood 60985:  
 Midwood 60986:  
 Midwood 60987:  Shared Beds by Marc Antoine
 Midwood 60988:  Possession by Frederick Bailey
 Midwood 60989:  
 Midwood 60990:  
 Midwood 60991:  Aunt Vera's Nephew by I. Krupp
 Midwood 60992:  
 Midwood 60993:  Girlstown by Dallas Mayo
 Midwood 60994:  Body Heat by Gerald Kramer
 Midwood 60995:  Pleasure's Their Business by March Hastings
 Midwood 60996:  Numpho On The Run by Brenda Curtiss
 Midwood 60997:  
 Midwood 60998:  Action Girls by Floyd Smith
 Midwood 60999:  Special Tastes by Jim Curry
 Midwood 61000:  
 Midwood 61001:  
 Midwood 61002:  
 Midwood 61003:  
 Midwood 61004:  
 Midwood 61005:  Rock-A-Bye, Baby by George Shaw
 Midwood 61006:  
 Midwood 61007:  Pretty Baby by Sloan Britain
 Midwood 61008:  Sables & Trash by Kirby Fuentes
 Midwood 61009:  
 Midwood 61010:  
 Midwood 61011:  Teacher's Pets by Matt Dorrance
 Midwood 61012:  So Soft by Ed Shaugnessy
 Midwood 61013:  
 Midwood 61014:  Wild Honey by Dora Carl
 Midwood 61015:  
 Midwood 61016:  
 Midwood 61017:  
 Midwood 61018:  
 Midwood 61019:  
 Midwood 61020:  
 Midwood 61021:  Scoring by Michael Kaye
 Midwood 61022:  CB Lust by Stan Shafer
 Midwood 61023:  Delicious Nightmare by Dallas Mayo
 Midwood 61024:  Doctor's Girl by Ted Kittering
 Midwood 61025:  
 Midwood 61026:  
 Midwood 61027:  
 Midwood 61028:  
 Midwood 61029:  
 Midwood 61030:  
 Midwood 61031:  
 Midwood 61032:  While The Cat's Away by Jack Walker
 Midwood 61033:  
 Midwood 61034:  
 Midwood 61035:  
 Midwood 61036:  
 Midwood 61037:  
 Midwood 61038:  Country Fever by Jim Curry
 Midwood 61039:  Love Lessons by Del Marks
 Midwood 61040:  
 Midwood 61041:  
 Midwood 61042:  
 Midwood 61043:  A Nest Of Lesbians by Dallas Mayo
 Midwood 61044:  
 Midwood 61045:  Night Game Girls [aka 'The Rookie's Wife'] by Ted Kittering
 Midwood 61046:  Tempting Daddy by I. Smithson
 Midwood 61047:  Sheila by Preston Harriman
 Midwood 61048:  
 Midwood 61049:  
 Midwood 61050:  
 Midwood 61051:  Hot Vibes by Dora Carl
 Midwood 61052:  
 Midwood 61053:  Search For Passion by Roy Battle
 Midwood 61054:  Teenage Lust by Jay Wood
 Midwood 61055:  
 Midwood 61056:  Lesbians In Hard Hats by Michael Scott
 Midwood 61057:  
 Midwood 61058:  Neighborly Affairs by Don Elcord
 Midwood 61059:  
 Midwood 61060:  
 Midwood 61061:  
 Midwood 61062:  His Sister Nicole by Kirby Fuentes
 Midwood 61063:  
 Midwood 61064:  
 Midwood 61065:  
 Midwood 61066:  Suburban Sin by Jack O. Strange
 Midwood 61067:  The Mexican Way by Jay Wood
 Midwood 61068:  
 Midwood 61069:  The X-Rated Teacher by Dorsey Lang
 Midwood 61070:  
 Midwood 61071:  Honey Pot by Tommie Reed
 Midwood 61072:  
 Midwood 61073:  
 Midwood 61074:  
 Midwood 61075:  Everybody's Darling by James Bennett
 Midwood 61076:  
 Midwood 61077:  Heat Of Passion by Scott Morris
 Midwood 61078:  
 Midwood 61079:  
 Midwood 61080:  
 Midwood 61081:  
 Midwood 61082:  Hot To Trot by Rose Darling
 Midwood 61083:  
 Midwood 61084:  
 Midwood 61085:  Ava's Box by Jay Wood
 Midwood 61086:  
 Midwood 61087:  Family Circle by Robert Victor
 Midwood 61088:  
 Midwood 61089:  
 Midwood 61090:  
 Midwood 61091:  
 Midwood 61092:  
 Midwood 61093:  
 Midwood 61094:  Love Wagon by Joseph Arrowsmith
 Midwood 61095:  
 Midwood 61096:  
 Midwood 61097:  
 Midwood 61098:  
 Midwood 61099:  
 Midwood 61100:  
 Midwood 61101:  Highway Hustlers by Robert Wahl
 Midwood 61102:  Loose Lady by Del Marks
 Midwood 61103:  
 Midwood 61104:  
 Midwood 61105:  Slut Ship by Michael Adrian
 Midwood 61106:  
 Midwood 61107:  
 Midwood 61108:  
 Midwood 61109:  
 Midwood 61110:  
 Midwood 61111:  
 Midwood 61112:  Bikini Girl [aka 'Girl in the Red Bikini'] by George Devlin
 Midwood 61113:  
 Midwood 61114:  Anything Goes by Curt Peterson
 Midwood 61115:  Three's Company by Joseph Arrowsmith
 Midwood 61116:  
 Midwood 61117:  
 Midwood 61118:  
 Midwood 61119:  
 Midwood 61120:  
 Midwood 61121:  Around The World by Bud Drake
 Midwood 61122:  
 Midwood 61123:  Joy Ride by Will Rudd
 Midwood 61124:  Devil In The Flesh by Gloria Steinway
 Midwood 61125:  Execuive Sweet by Jack Walker
 Midwood 61126:  Brenda's Summer Love by Don Elcord
 Midwood 61127:  
 Midwood 61128:  
 Midwood 61129:  Joanie by Michael Doren
 Midwood 61130:  
 Midwood 61131:  One Girl's Lust by Michael Dean
 Midwood 61132:  
 Midwood 61133:  
 Midwood 61134:  Beach Baby by Joseph Arrowsmith
 Midwood 61135:  Blonde Vixen by George Devlin
 Midwood 61136:  Carol's Sex Fever by Jay Wood
 Midwood 61137:  
 Midwood 61138:  Darling Daughter by Joseph Arrowsmith
 Midwood 61139:  The Real Thing by James Charles
 Midwood 61140:  
 Midwood 61141:  
 Midwood 61142:  
 Midwood 61143:  Family Secrets by Chris Harrison
 Midwood 61144:  
 Midwood 61145:  Strange Trio by Michael Doren
 Midwood 61146:  
 Midwood 61147:  Everybody's Virgin by Debbie Ray
 Midwood 61148:  First Time Swingers by Roy Battle
 Midwood 61149:  
 Midwood 61150:  
 Midwood 61151:  
 Midwood 61152:  
 Midwood 61153:  
 Midwood 61154:  The Husband Taster by Don Elcord
 Midwood 61155:  Taxi Tramps by Chris Harrison
 Midwood 61156:  
 Midwood 61157:  
 Midwood 61158:  Overripe by Ginger Craft
 Midwood 61159:  Sex Kitten by Jason Hyte
 Midwood 61160:  
 Midwood 61161:  Love Feast by Michael Doren
 Midwood 61162:  
 Midwood 61163:  Bustin' Out by Lee Server
 Midwood 61164:  Leona's Lust by Doris Holliday
 Midwood 61165:  
 Midwood 61166:  
 Midwood 61167:  
 Midwood 61168:  
 Midwood 61169:  French Ways by Bud Drake
 Midwood 61170:  
 Midwood 61171:  Mouth To Mouth by Jason Hyte
 Midwood 61172:  Kinky Tramp by Chris Harrison
 Midwood 61173:  Lessons In Lesbian Love by Dallas Mayo
 Midwood 61174:  
 Midwood 61175:  
 Midwood 61176:  Water Sports by Joseph Arrowsmith
 Midwood 61177:  
 Midwood 61178:  
 Midwood 61179:  
 Midwood 61180:  
 Midwood 61181:  
 Midwood 61182:  Wet Lips by Jason Hytes
 Midwood 61183:  
 Midwood 61184:  
 Midwood 61185:  
 Midwood 61186:  
 Midwood 61187:  A Real Hot Number by Chris Simon
 Midwood 61188:  
 Midwood 61189:  
 Midwood 61190:  Dr. Feelgood by Chris Harrison
 Midwood 61191:  
 Midwood 61192:  
 Midwood 61193:  
 Midwood 61194:  
 Midwood 61195:  
 Midwood 61196:  
 Midwood 61197:  
 Midwood 61198:  
 Midwood 61199:  
 Midwood 61200:  
 Midwood 61201:  
 Midwood 61202:  The Leather Game by Dora Carl
 Midwood 61203:  
 Midwood 61204:  
 Midwood 61205:  
 Midwood 61206:  
 Midwood 61207:  Girl In Heat by George Devlin
 Midwood 61208:  
 Midwood 61209:  
 Midwood 61210:  Lusty Lady by Michael Doren
 Midwood 61211:  Staying On Top by Robert Wahl
 Midwood 61212:  Teacher Of Desire by Peter Caine
 Midwood 61213:  Mountain Maid by Jack O. Stange
 Midwood 61214:  Insatiable by George Devlin
 Midwood 61215:  Summer Of Shame by Vincent Church
 Midwood 61216:  
 Midwood 61217:  
 Midwood 61218:  
 Midwood 61219:  Everybody's Girl by Joseph Arrowsmith
 Midwood 61220:  Sorority Sinners by Simeon Morris
 Midwood 61221:  Reckless Flesh by Ben Doughty
 Midwood 61222:  Kiss Of The Lash by Kirgy Fuentes
 Midwood 61223:  Virgin Territory by Seymour Harris
 Midwood 61224:  
 Midwood 61225:  Red And Hot by Del Marks
 Midwood 61226:  
 Midwood 61227:  
 Midwood 61228:  No Price Too High by Doris Holliday
 Midwood 61229:  
 Midwood 61230:  
 Midwood 61231:  
 Midwood 61232:  Mind Over Mattress by Margot Peters
 Midwood 61233:  Lady Jock by Jay Wood
 Midwood 61234:  
 Midwood 61235:  Breakfast For Four by Chris Harrison
 Midwood 61236:  Twisted Flesh by George Myers
 Midwood 61237:  
 Midwood 61238:  Shampoo Girl by Michael Jones
 Midwood 61239:  Enraptured Lovers by March Hastings
 Midwood 61240:  
 Midwood 61241:  
 Midwood 61242:  
 Midwood 61243:  Cruise Girl by Rose Darling
 Midwood 61244:  Topless by Robert Wahl
 Midwood 61245:  
 Midwood 61246:  Naked And Ready by T.S. Hanley
 Midwood 61247:  
 Midwood 61248:  CB Nymph by Jonathan Quist
 Midwood 61249:  
 Midwood 61250:  Three Way Love by Bronc Calloway
 Midwood 61251:  Handy Man by Stan Myers
 Midwood 61252:  Hayloft Capers by ?
 Midwood 61253:  Three For Pain by Jack O. Stange
 Midwood 61254:  Lessons In Lust by ?
 Midwood 61255:  Practice Dolls by ?
 Midwood 61256:  Super-Stud by ?
 Midwood 61257:  
 Midwood 61258:  
 Midwood 61259:  Available Susie by Roy Battle
 Midwood 61260:  Sugar Baby by Joseph Arrowsmith
 Midwood 61261:  
 Midwood 61262:  
 Midwood 61263:  
 Midwood 61264:  
 Midwood 61265:  Tarnished Angel by Don Starr
 Midwood 61266:  
 Midwood 61267:  
 Midwood 61268:  Love Thy Brother by Ginger Craft
 Midwood 61269:  
 Midwood 61270:  
 Midwood 61271:  
 Midwood 61272:  Summer Sex by Jay Wood
 Midwood 61273:  Peeper by Jason Hyte
 Midwood 61274:  
 Midwood 61275:  
 Midwood 61276:  Virgin by Robert Wahl
 Midwood 61277:  Service by ?
 Midwood 61278:  Swingers by ?
 Midwood 61279:  Double Trouble by Stan Shafer
 Midwood 61280:  Floating Orgy by ?
 Midwood 61281:  Trailer Park Tramps by Pepper Starling
 Midwood 61282:  Girl Cop by Kirby Fuentes
 Midwood 61283:  Sex Before Six by Jason Hytes
 Midwood 61284:  Hotel Lust by Lee Server
 Midwood 61285:  Neighborhood Swap by Don Elcord
 Midwood 61286:  Hungry Wives by Guy Sanders
 Midwood 61287:  Honey Bear by Jack Adams
 Midwood 61288:  Pleasure Quest by Don Starr
 Midwood 61289:  Hot Playmates by ?
 Midwood 61290:  Passion Arrangement by ?
 Midwood 61291:  Nympho Nurse by Mel Johnson
 Midwood 61292:  Miss Galaxy's Thrills by ?
 Midwood 61293:  Housewives' Secrets by Doris Holliday
 Midwood 61294:  Sinners Unlimited by Jonathan Swift
 Midwood 61295:  Swinging Swappers by Margot Peters
 Midwood 61296:  Wild For Thrills by ?
 Midwood 61297:  Network Nymphs by L.L. Goode
 Midwood 61298:  Voyeur's Delight by Alan Bell
 Midwood 61299:  
 Midwood 61300:  
 Midwood 61301:  
 Midwood 61302:  
 Midwood 61303:  Doing It With Doc [aka 'Doing It With Doctor'] by Edwin Mozler
 Midwood 61304:  
 Midwood 61305:  Making Mary by ? + Lady Sings The Hots by Dorsey Lang
 Midwood 61306:  Call Me Kitten by Cory Mallord + Fair Exchange by Leslie Roote
 Midwood 61307:  Mountain Hussies by ?
 Midwood 61308:  Lust Boat by Margot Peters
 Midwood 61309:  Made For Sex by Don Starr
 Midwood 61310:  
 Midwood 61311:  Sex Tool by Chris Harrison
 Midwood 61312:  
 Midwood 61313:  X-Rated Virgin by Stan Shafer
 Midwood 61314:  Love Spurt by Linda DuBreuil
 Midwood 61315:  
 Midwood 61316:  Prisoner Of Pleasure by Brenda Piersall
 Midwood 61317:  Paula's Passion by Ralph Burgess
 Midwood 61318:  French Trip by Robert Wahl
 Midwood 61319:  
 Midwood 61320:  
 Midwood 61321:  Wild Honey by Dora Carl + Nymph by Dorsey Lang
 Midwood 61322:  Summer Of Sin by Don Starr + Campus Tramp by Lawrence Block
 Midwood 61323:  I Want It All by Doris Holliday
 Midwood 61324:  Hot Teacher by ?
 Midwood 61325:  Ski-Lodge Lovers by Michael Scott
 Midwood 61326:  Bluegrass Groupies by Jack O. Stange
 Midwood 61327:  Bare It, Charity [aka 'Bare It'] by Peter Quinn
 Midwood 61328:  Wild Cherry by John C. Douglas
 Midwood 61329:  Torrid by Norton McVickers
 Midwood 61330:  
 Midwood 61331:  
 Midwood 61332:  Swinging Cop by Bud Drake
 Midwood 61333:  
 Midwood 61334:  Secrets Of Olympic Village by Susan Ashley
 Midwood 61335:  Wicked Bodies by Doris Holliday
 Midwood 61336:  
 Midwood 61337:  Daytime Affairs by Michael Scott + Side Street Sex by Michael Scott
 Midwood 61338:  
 Midwood 61339:  
 Midwood 61340:  
 Midwood 61341:  Twisted Love by Jackson Crain
 Midwood 61342:  
 Midwood 61343:  
 Midwood 61344:  Hungry Wives by Guy Sanders
 Midwood 61345:  
 Midwood 61346:  
 Midwood 61347:  
 Midwood 61348:  
 Midwood 61349:  
 Midwood 61350:  The Outsiders by Robert Conrad
 Midwood 61351:  Vice Is Nice by Rob O'Neal
 Midwood 61352:  His Sister Taught Him by Robert McAfee
 Midwood 61353:  Swinging Housewife by Jack Marsh + Reckless Redhead by Jack Marsh
 Midwood 61354:  Strange Hungers by Don Starr + Any Man's Woman by Don Starr
 Midwood 61355:  
 Midwood 61356:  
 Midwood 61357:  
 Midwood 61358:  
 Midwood 61359:  
 Midwood 61360:  
 Midwood 61361:  Naked Caller by Randy Hale
 Midwood 61362:  
 Midwood 61363:  
 Midwood 61364:  
 Midwood 61365:  
 Midwood 61366:  
 Midwood 61367:  
 Midwood 61368:  Sweet Cream by Dallas Mayo
 Midwood 61369:  Prisoner Of Lust by Michael Scott + Sex Library by Michael Scott
 Midwood 61370:  Wild Teens by Jack Marsh + Hot Hands by Jack Marsh
 Midwood 61371:  
 Midwood 61372:  Switching Party by Jay Wood
 Midwood 61373:  
 Midwood 61374:  
 Midwood 61375:  Soft And Warm by Terry Fisher
 Midwood 61376:  Learning From Lovers by Max Nortic
 Midwood 61377:  Silken Idol by Robert Moore
 Midwood 61378:  
 Midwood 61379:  
 Midwood 61380:  Virgin's Flight Plan by Del Marks
 Midwood 61381:  
 Midwood 61382:  Impatient Virgin by Andrew Laird
 Midwood 61383:  High School Sinners by Godfrey Ramdigger
 Midwood 61384:  
 Midwood 61385:  
 Midwood 61386:  
 Midwood 61387:  
 Midwood 61388:  
 Midwood 61389:  
 Midwood 61390:  
 Midwood 61391:  
 Midwood 61392:  Meet Marilyn by Thomas Cassidy
 Midwood 61393:  
 Midwood 61394:  Honky-Tonk Girl by J. Holbrook
 Midwood 61395:  Hot Sister by Brian Denny
 Midwood 61396:  Inside Eve by Todd Edmund
 Midwood 61397:  Strong In The Saddle by Bret Steele
 Midwood 61398:  
 Midwood 61399:  I Confess by Chris Harrison
 Midwood 61400:  
 Midwood 61401:  
 Midwood 61402:  
 Midwood 61403:  Taking A Chance On Lust by Charles E. Bates
 Midwood 61404:  Naked Skater by Doris Holiday
 Midwood 61405:  Possessed By Passion by Dick Marx
 Midwood 61406:  Campus Heat by Margot Peters
 Midwood 61407:  Caught In The Act by Jason Hytes
 Midwood 61408:  Swinging Co-ed by Jack O. Stange
 Midwood 61409:  Free Samples by Jack Walker
 Midwood 61410:  
 Midwood 61411:  Groupies by Michael Scott
 Midwood 61412:  
 Midwood 61413:  Blue Movie Girl by Jim Curry
 Midwood 61414:  Plaything by Andrew Laird
 Midwood 61415:  Wild by Vincent Church
 Midwood 61416:  Love Means Never Saying No by Brian Hartley
 Midwood 61417:  
 Midwood 61418:  
 Midwood 61419:  
 Midwood 61420:  Games For Three by Micahel Doren
 Midwood 61421:  
 Midwood 61422:  Secretary's Tricks by Robert Wahl
 Midwood 61423:  
 Midwood 61424:  Four Of A Kind by Jason Hytes
 Midwood 61425:  
 Midwood 61426:  Peeping Tom by Jason Hytes
 Midwood 61427:  
 Midwood 61428:  
 Midwood 61429:  
 Midwood 61430:  Lost Innocence by Amanda King
 Midwood 61431:  
 Midwood 61432:  
 Midwood 61433:  
 Midwood 61434:  Perfumed Trap by Don Starr + Hot Hostage by Dora Carl
 Midwood 61435:  
 Midwood 61436:  
 Midwood 61437:  Special Services by Dick Marx
 Midwood 61438:  Virgin No More by Jack O. Strange
 Midwood 61439:  
 Midwood 61440:  Easy Entry by Joseph Arrowsmith
 Midwood 61441:  
 Midwood 61442:  Deep And Warm by Jacque Etienne
 Midwood 61443:  
 Midwood 61444:  Doctor Plays Dirty by Roy Battle
 Midwood 61445:  Erica's Magic Touch by Jason Hytes
 Midwood 61446:  
 Midwood 61447:  
 Midwood 61448:  Degraded Teenager by Vincent Church
 Midwood 61449:  
 Midwood 61450:  
 Midwood 61451:  
 Midwood 61452:  Sex In The Afternoon by Jack O. Strange
 Midwood 61453:  Your Bath Or Mine by Janis Pearl
 Midwood 61454:  
 Midwood 61455:  
 Midwood 61456:  Turned On Nympho by Joseph Arrowsmith
 Midwood 61457:  
 Midwood 61458:  
 Midwood 61459:  
 Midwood 61460:  
 Midwood 61461:  Sweet Betsy by Stan Shafer
 Midwood 61462:  
 Midwood 61463:  
 Midwood 61464:  
 Midwood 61465:  
 Midwood 61466:  
 Midwood 61467:  
 Midwood 61468:  
 Midwood 61469:  
 Midwood 61470:  
 Midwood 61471:  
 Midwood 61472:  Sticky Pants by Arnold Pennington
 Midwood 61473:  Once In Love With Amy by Seth Bates
 Midwood 61474:  
 Midwood 61475:  Housewife Hooker by Michael Scott
 Midwood 61476:  
 Midwood 61477:  
 Midwood 61478:  
 Midwood 61479:  Private Sessions by March Hastings
 Midwood 61480:  Willing Housewives by Del Marks
 Midwood 61481:  
 Midwood 61482:  
 Midwood 61483:  
 Midwood 61484:  Strangers In Bed by Dick Marx
 Midwood 61485:  
 Midwood 61486:  Doll Baby by James Leo
 Midwood 61487:  The Rancher's Daughter by ?
 Midwood 61488:  Bush Country by Robert McAfee
 Midwood 61489:  Love Doctor by Ralph Blasi
 Midwood 61490:  Hot Wife by ?
 Midwood 61491:  Sinful Sisters by ?
 Midwood 61492:  A Beautiful Piece by ?
 Midwood 61493:  
 Midwood 61494:  
 Midwood 61495:  
 Midwood 61496:  Born Different by Terry Fisher
 Midwood 61497:  
 Midwood 61498:  
 Midwood 61499:  Rich Bitch by ?
 Midwood 61500:  
 Midwood 61501:  Campus Tramp by Robert Wahl
 Midwood 61502:  
 Midwood 61503:  Swappers Unlimited by George Devlin
 Midwood 61504:  Bad Girl In Town by George Devlin
 Midwood 61505:  
 Midwood 61506:  
 Midwood 61507:  
 Midwood 61508:  
 Midwood 61509:  Massage Parlor by Del Marks
 Midwood 61510:  
 Midwood 61511:  Over-Developed by Jason Hytes
 Midwood 61512:  Route 69 by Chris Harrison
 Midwood 61513:  
 Midwood 61514:  Cherry Pink by Brian Summers + Reckless Flesh by John Deli
 Midwood 61515:  
 Midwood 61516:  One More Time by Robert Wahl
 Midwood 61517:  
 Midwood 61518:  Hot Secretary by Earl Arno
 Midwood 61519:  
 Midwood 61520:  
 Midwood 61521:  
 Midwood 61522:  
 Midwood 61523:  
 Midwood 61524:  
 Midwood 61525:  We Two by Dallas Mayo
 Midwood 61526:  
 Midwood 61527:  
 Midwood 61528:  Heat Of Passion by Scott Morris
 Midwood 61529:  Lusty Nashville by Michael Doren
 Midwood 61530:  
 Midwood 61531:  Sinful Wives by Doris Holliday
 Midwood 61532:  
 Midwood 61533:  
 Midwood 61534:  Sex Ship by Jack O. Strange
 Midwood 61535:  
 Midwood 61536:  
 Midwood 61537:  
 Midwood 61538:  
 Midwood 61539:  
 Midwood 61540:  
 Midwood 61541:  
 Midwood 61542:  Sex - Southern Style by Roy Battle
 Midwood 61543:  Pool Of Loneliness by Dallas Mayo
 Midwood 61544:  
 Midwood 61545:  
 Midwood 61546:  
 Midwood 61547:  
 Midwood 61548:  Teen Model by Robert Wahl
 Midwood 61549:  
 Midwood 61550:  
 Midwood 61551:  
 Midwood 61552:  Impatient Age by Jock O. Stange
 Midwood 61553:  
 Midwood 61554:  
 Midwood 61555:  
 Midwood 61556:  
 Midwood 61557:  
 Midwood 61558:  
 Midwood 61559:  Silky by Joseph Arrowsmith
 Midwood 61560:  Sticky Fingers by Ricardo Santagata
 Midwood 61561:  The Hard Way by Michael Doren
 Midwood 61562:  Julia's One Night Stands by Anthony Dunne
 Midwood 61562:  Pleasure Addict by Jack O'Strange
 Midwood 61563:  Miss Stuck-Up by Rob O'Neal
 Midwood 61564:  
 Midwood 61565:  Girl Next Door by Earl Arno
 Midwood 61566:  
 Midwood 61567:  
 Midwood 61568:  
 Midwood 61569:  Deep Thrust by Del Marks
 Midwood 61570:  Campus Love-In by Margot Peters
 Midwood 61571:  
 Midwood 61572:  File Under 'Passion' by Michael Doren
 Midwood 61573:  The Fluffy Girl by Dallas Mayo
 Midwood 61574:  
 Midwood 61575:  Pale Throat by Carlton Lake
 Midwood 61576:  
 Midwood 61577:  
 Midwood 61578:  
 Midwood 61579:  Erotic Festival by Robert Wahl
 Midwood 61580:  
 Midwood 61581:  
 Midwood 61582:  
 Midwood 61583:  
 Midwood 61584:  
 Midwood 61585:  
 Midwood 61586:  
 Midwood 61587:  Never Say No by Jay Wood
 Midwood 61588:  
 Midwood 61589:  The Love Seekers by Gerald Kramer
 Midwood 61590:  
 Midwood 61591:  Rosa's Way by Joseph Arrowsmith
 Midwood 61592:  
 Midwood 61593:  
 Midwood 61594:  
 Midwood 61595:  
 Midwood 61596:  Free And Easy by Robert Wahl
 Midwood 61597:  
 Midwood 61598:  
 Midwood 61599:  
 Midwood 61600:  Sleeping Around by Marshall Jacks
 Midwood 61601:  
 Midwood 61602:  
 Midwood 61603:  
 Midwood 61604:  
 Midwood 61605:  Mate Sharing by Jay Wood
 Midwood 61606:  Campus Lust by Tony McBride
 Midwood 61607:  Schoolmates by ?
 Midwood 61608:  
 Midwood 61609:  
 Midwood 61610:  
 Midwood 61611:  
 Midwood 61612:  Overheated by Earl Arno
 Midwood 61613:  
 Midwood 61614:  
 Midwood 61615:  
 Midwood 61616:  
 Midwood 61617:  
 Midwood 61618:  
 Midwood 61619:  
 Midwood 61620:  Bad Sister by Roy Battle
 Midwood 61621:  
 Midwood 61622:  
 Midwood 61623:  
 Midwood 61624:  Girlstown by Dallas Mayo
 Midwood 61625:  
 Midwood 61626:  Five O'Clock Kicks by Roger Biggers
 Midwood 61627:  Sex School by Don Starr
 Midwood 61628:  
 Midwood 61629:  
 Midwood 61630:  
 Midwood 61631:  
 Midwood 61632:  
 Midwood 61633:  
 Midwood 61634:  Body Heat by Gerald Kramer
 Midwood 61635:  Special Tastes by Jim Curry
 Midwood 61636:  
 Midwood 61637:  
 Midwood 61638:  
 Midwood 61639:  
 Midwood 61640:  Mommy's Sick Friends by B. Redding
 Midwood 61641:  The Body Shop by J.J. Madison
 Midwood 61642:  Teasin' Redhead by ?
 Midwood 61643:  One Hot Weekend by J.C. Comstock
 Midwood 61644:  Cool Lips - Hot Hips by ?
 Midwood 61645:  Too Many Men by ?
 Midwood 61646:  Teen Swinger by Terry Cash
 Midwood 61647:  Always Available by Jim Conroy
 Midwood 61648:  Laid Back Lady by ?
 Midwood 61649:  Point Red by Veronica
 Midwood 61650:  Shared Beds by Marc Antoine
 Midwood 61651:  Just Whistle by Joseph Arrowsmith
 Midwood 61652:  The Devil Made Me Do It by Guy Martin
 Midwood 61653:  Superstar Sex by Don Starr
 Midwood 61654:  Possession by Frederick Bailey
 Midwood 61655:  Open Kiss by Ivan Zummo
 Midwood 61656:  Lovely Rogue by Thomas Morley
 Midwood 61657:  Daddy's Darling by Don Starr
 Midwood 61658:  Magda's Lust by ?
 Midwood 61659:  She Wanted Everything by Dick Marx
 Midwood 61660:  Wide Open by ?
 Midwood 61661:  Family Affair by Margo Peters
 Midwood 61662:  Pleasure Addict by Jack O. Strange
 Midwood 61663:  Fetish Paradise by Lee Server
 Midwood 61664:  Topless Virgin by Michael Doren
 Midwood 61665:  Indoor Sports by Jack Walker
 Midwood 61666:  Bed Fun - Country Style by Dora Carl
 Midwood 61667:  Laundromat Jezebels by ?
 Midwood 61668:  Touching by Robert Conrad
 Midwood 61669:  Nude Beauty by ?
 Midwood 61670:  Getting Gloria by ?
 Midwood 61671:  Cloud Nine by Roy L. Couch
 Midwood 61672:  Teach Me by ?
 Midwood 61673:  Swap Party by Don Starr
 Midwood 61674:  Rough Sex by ?
 Midwood 61675:  Nympho On The Run by Brenda Curtis
 Midwood 61676:  Campus Virgin by ?
 Midwood 61677:  One Night Stand [aka 'Scandal'] by Dallas Mayo
 Midwood 61678:  Sin Time by Terry Shaffer
 Midwood 61679:  Make Me! by ?
 Midwood 61680:  Teenage Tease by Pepper Starling
 Midwood 61681:  Try Me by ?
 Midwood 61682:  Country Club Capers by Jim Curry
 Midwood 61683:  Dial Me For Love by Bud Drake
 Midwood 61684:  Pink Lips by Robert Conrad
 Midwood 61685:  Teenage Beach Bunny by Del Marks
 Midwood 61686:  The Secret by Dallas Mayo
 Midwood 61687:  Coming Loose by ?
 Midwood 61688:  Quartette by Jonathon Quist
 Midwood 61689:  Roll Over Easy by ?
 Midwood 61690:  Lisa's Hot Summer by Michael Doren
 Midwood 61691:  Night Action by ?
 Midwood 61692:  Loving It Hard by ?
 Midwood 61693:  Hot Trail by Bret Steele
 Midwood 61694:  Teasin' Bitch by ?
 Midwood 61695:  Over-Exposed by Jason Hytes
 Midwood 61696:  Delicious Nightmare by Dallas Mayo
 Midwood 61697:  Vibrations by ?
 Midwood 61698:  Sables And Trash by ?
 Midwood 61699:  Teacher's Pet by Edward McCallin
 Midwood 61700:  She Loves It In The Country by ?
 Midwood 61701:  Pillow Talk by Sloan Britain
 Midwood 61702:  Slow Burn by Marcus Pendanter
 Midwood 61703:  Shame by ?
 Midwood 61704:  Call Girls' Doctor by ?
 Midwood 61705:  Ripe And Ready by ?
 Midwood 61706:  Strange Triangle by Chris Harrison
 Midwood 61707:  Orgy Club by ?
 Midwood 61708:  Wild Honey by ?
 Midwood 61709:  Hotel Hostess by Brad Curtis
 Midwood 61710:  Wives On The Loose by ?
 Midwood 61711:  Vixens by Jason Hytes
 Midwood 61712:  Sexy Kitten by ?
 Midwood 61713:  Christine's Savage Passions by ?
 Midwood 61714:  Pleasure Thrust by ?
 Midwood 61715:  Joanie by ?
 Midwood 61716:  Carol's Sex Fever by Jay Wood
 Midwood 61717:  Darling Daughter by Joseph Arrowsmith
 Midwood 61718:  Family Secrets by Chris Harrison
 Midwood 61719:  One Girl's Lust by Michael Doren
 Midwood 61720:  Tiger Girl by Guy Martin
 Midwood 61721:  
 Midwood 61722:  
 Midwood 61723:  
 Midwood 61724:  Girl-Crazy Girl by Dallas Mayo + For Women Only by Dallas Mayo
 Midwood 61725:  
 Midwood 61726:  High School Sinners by Godfrey Ramdigger + The Mating Game by Tim Lang
 Midwood 61727:  
 Midwood 61728:  
 Midwood 61729:  Beach Party by Joseph Arrowsmith
 Midwood 61730:  
 Midwood 61731:  
 Midwood 61732:  
 Midwood 61733:  
 Midwood 61734:  Her Private Boy [aka 'Nothing To It'] by Raphael Blasi
 Midwood 61735:  
 Midwood 61736:  
 Midwood 61737:  
 Midwood 61738:  
 Midwood 61739:  
 Midwood 61740:  Wild Cherry by John C. Douglas + Brenda's Last Fling by Veronica King
 Midwood 61741:  
 Midwood 61742:  
 Midwood 61743:  Housewife Call Girl by Jack O. Stange
 Midwood 61744:  Lessons In Lesbian Love by Dallas Mayo
 Midwood 61745:  
 Midwood 61746:  
 Midwood 61747:  
 Midwood 61748:  
 Midwood 61749:  
 Midwood 61750:  
 Midwood 61751:  
 Midwood 61752:  
 Midwood 61753:  
 Midwood 61754:  
 Midwood 61755:  
 Midwood 61756:  
 Midwood 61757:  Sex Circus Sisters by Jack Vaste + Call It Sin by Austin Barr
 Midwood 61758:  
 Midwood 61759:  
 Midwood 61760:  
 Midwood 61761:  Teen Tramp by Ricardo Santagata
 Midwood 61762:  
 Midwood 61763:  
 Midwood 61764:  
 Midwood 61765:  Blonde Vixen by George Devlin
 Midwood 61766:  
 Midwood 61767:  Your Bed Or Mine by Jim Curry
 Midwood 61768:  Love Thy Brother by Ginger Craft
 Midwood 61769:  
 Midwood 61770:  
 Midwood 61771:  Down On The Farm by Brian Clemens + Keyhole Kicks by Susan Ashley
 Midwood 61772:  
 Midwood 61773:  
 Midwood 61774:  
 Midwood 61775:  
 Midwood 61776:  
 Midwood 61777:  
 Midwood 61778:  
 Midwood 61779:  
 Midwood 61780:  
 Midwood 61781:  
 Midwood 61782:  
 Midwood 61783:  A Real Hot Number by Chris Simon
 Midwood 61784:  
 Midwood 61785:  
 Midwood 61786:  
 Midwood 61787:  
 Midwood 61788:  The Incest Game by Ted Kittering + Donna's Delight by Randy Hale
 Midwood 61789:  
 Midwood 61790:  
 Midwood 61791:  
 Midwood 61792:  
 Midwood 61793:  
 Midwood 61794:  
 Midwood 61795:  Betty's Gang Bang by Joseph Arrowsmith
 Midwood 61796:  
 Midwood 61797:  A Degrading Affair by Bert Phelan
 Midwood 61798:  Meet Marilyn by Thomas Cassidy
 Midwood 61799:  No Price Too High by Doris Holliday
 Midwood 61800:  
 Midwood 61801:  
 Midwood 61802:  
 Midwood 61803:  
 Midwood 61804:  Pussy's Brother by Erik Hampton + Insatiable by George Devlin
 Midwood 61805:  Mail Order Sex by Dek Marks + Wet Lips by Robert Evelyn
 Midwood 61806:  
 Midwood 61807:  
 Midwood 61808:  
 Midwood 61809:  Family Fun [aka 'Sins Of Our Father'] by Margot Peters
 Midwood 61810:  
 Midwood 61811:  
 Midwood 61812:  
 Midwood 61813:  
 Midwood 61814:  
 Midwood 61815:  Mind Over Mattress by Margot Peters
 Midwood 61816:  
 Midwood 61817:  Carnival Of Lust by Marlin Cruse
 Midwood 61818:  
 Midwood 61819:  
 Midwood 61820:  The Willing Captive by Antony Dunne

See also 
 Pulp magazine
 Lesbian pulp fiction

References

Notes

Sources consulted 

 Midwood at Books Are Everything!
 Midwood at Lynn Monroe Books

External links 
 Midwood Books cover gallery

Defunct book publishing companies of the United States
Book publishing companies based in New York City
Comic book publishing companies of the United States
Publishing companies based in New York City
Publishing companies established in 1957
1957 establishments in New York City